= Platonic love =

Non-sexual love

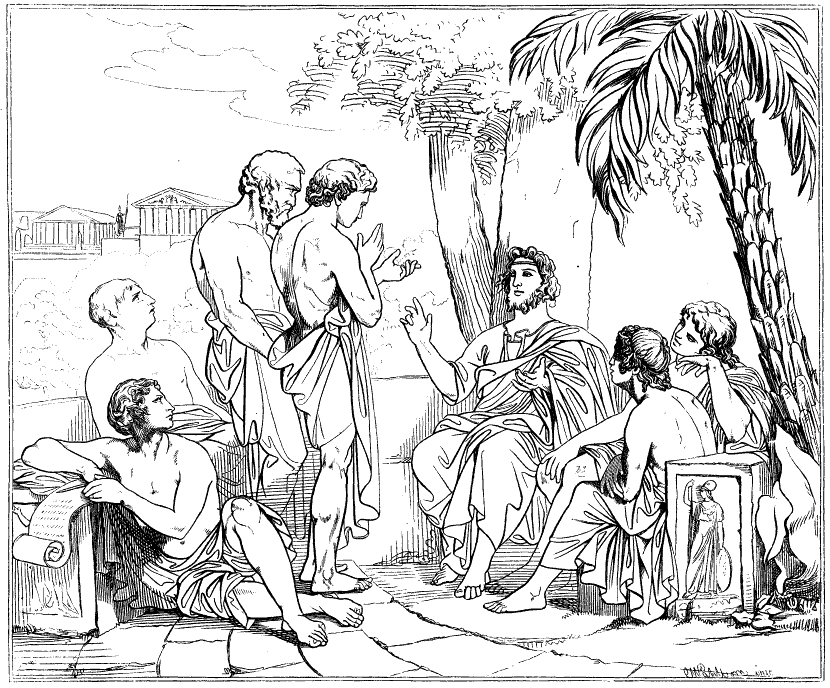
Plato and his students

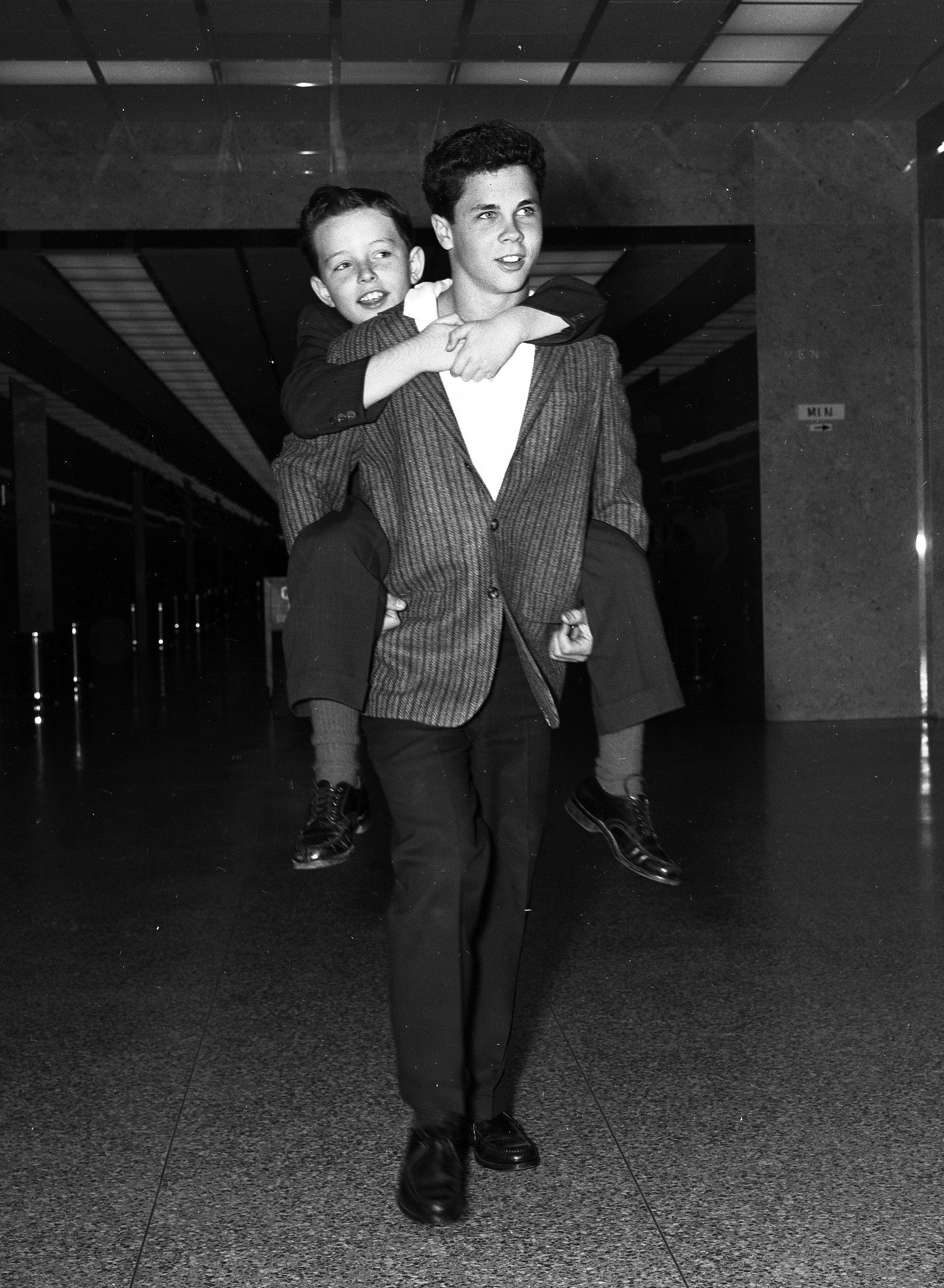
Actors Jerry Mathers (left) and Tony Dow (right), who co-star in Leave It to Beaver, sharing a friendly offscreen interaction in 1959

Platonic love is a type of love which is friendly, affectionate, or even passionate, but sexual desire is nonexistent, suppressed or sublimated.

The term is derived from the name of the Greek philosopher Plato, although modern use of the term does not necessarily refer to his idea of love. Plato's concept concerned spiritual growth, expressed using the metaphor of a ladder which the lover ascends. Physical attraction to a particular beautiful body is only at the bottom; as the lover ascends the ladder, a love for absolute beauty itself is the ultimate inspiration at the top.

In the 15th century, a Latin term for Plato's idea of love, amor platonicus, was coined by Marsilio Ficino; "platonic love" then entered the English language in the 1630s, when Neoplatonism was a fad among royalty. Later, by the time of the 18th century, the term came to be used more in the modern sense to mean a sexless relationship.

Platonic love is not always mutually exclusive with romance or passion, however. For example, a romantic friendship involves passionate feelings without sexual desire.

Plato's ideal where the lover achieves transcendence through nonsexual adoration has also been interpreted as a positive conception of passionate love—usually only between men in ancient Greece. The ancient Greeks thought of love and marriage as separate; they did have a concept of passionate, romantic love, but it was typically viewed as a madness and only depicted in literature.

== Classical philosophical interpretation ==
Platonic love is examined in Plato's dialogue, the Symposium, which has as its topic the subject of love, or more generally the subject of Eros. It explains the possibilities of how the feeling of love began and how it has evolved, both sexually and non-sexually, and defines genuine platonic love as inspiring a person's mind and soul and directing their attention towards spiritual matters.

This is of particular importance to Socrates, who attributes platonic love as the means to an ascent, known as the "Ladder of Love", to the prophet Diotima. Generally for Diotima and Plato the most correct use of love of human beings is to direct one's mind to the love of divinity. Socrates defines love based on separate classifications of pregnancy (to bear offspring); pregnancy of the body, pregnancy of the soul, and direct connection to existence. Pregnancy of the body results in human children. Pregnancy of the soul, the next step in the process, produces "virtue"—which is the soul (truth) translating itself into material form.

"... virtue for the Greeks means self-sameness ... in Plato's terms, Being or idea."(106)

In the following quote, the author simplifies the idea of virtue as simply what is "good".

"... what is good is beautiful, and what is beautiful is good ..."

=== Eros ===
Pausanias, in Plato's Symposium (181b–182a), defines two types of the love known as "Eros": vulgar Eros, or earthly love, and divine Eros, or divine love. Pausanias defines vulgar Eros as material attraction towards a person's beauty for the purposes of physical pleasure and reproduction, and divine Eros as starting from physical attraction but transcending gradually to love for supreme beauty, placed on a similar level to the divine. This concept of divine Eros was later transformed into the term "platonic love".

Vulgar Eros and divine Eros were both considered to be connected, and part of the same continuous process of pursuing perfection of one's being, with the purpose of mending one's human nature and eventually reaching a point of unity where there is no longer an aspiration or need to change.

"Eros is ... a moment of transcendence ... in so far as the other can never be possessed without being annihilated in its status as the other, at which point both desire and transcendence would cease ... (84)

=== Ladder of Love ===
The Ladder of Love is a metaphor that relates each step toward Being as consecutive rungs of a ladder. Each step closer to the truth further distances love from beauty of the body toward love that is more focused on wisdom and the essence of beauty.

The ladder starts with carnal attraction of body for body, progressing to a love for body and soul. Eventually, in time, with consequent steps up the ladder, the idea of beauty is eventually no longer connected with a body, but entirely united with Being itself.

"[...] decent human beings must be gratified, as well as those that are not as yet decent, so that they might become more decent; and the love of the decent must be preserved." (187d, 17) - Eryximachus' "completion" of Pausanias' speech on Eros

==== Tragedy and comedy ====
Plato's Symposium defines two extremes in the process of platonic love; the entirely carnal and the entirely ethereal. These two extremes of love are seen by the Greeks in terms of tragedy and comedy. According to Diotima in her discussion with Socrates, for anyone to achieve the final rung in the Ladder of Love, they would essentially transcend the body and rise to immortality—gaining direct access to Being. Such a form of love is impossible for a mortal to achieve.

What Plato describes as "pregnancy of the body" is entirely carnal and seeks pleasure and beauty in bodily form only. This is the type of love, that, according to Socrates, is practiced by animals.

"Now, if both these portraits of love, the tragic and the comic, are exaggerations, then we could say that the genuine portrayal of Platonic love is the one that lies between them. The love described as the one practiced by those who are pregnant according to the soul, who partake of both the realm of beings and the realm of Being, who grasp Being indirectly, through the mediation of beings, would be a love that Socrates could practice."

===== Tragedy =====
Diotima considers the carnal limitation of human beings to the pregnancy of the body to be a form of tragedy, as it separates someone from the pursuit of truth. One would be forever limited to beauty of the body, never being able to access the true essence of beauty.

===== Comedy =====
Diotima considers the idea of a mortal having direct access to Being to be a comic situation simply because of the impossibility of it. The offspring of true virtue would essentially lead to a mortal achieving immortality.

=== Neoplatonism ===
In the Middle Ages, new interest in the works of Plato, his philosophy and his view of love became more popular, spurred on by Georgios Gemistos Plethon during the Councils of Ferrara and Firenze in 1438–1439. Later in 1469, Marsilio Ficino put forward a theory of neo-platonic love, in which he defined love as a personal ability of an individual, which guides their soul towards cosmic processes, lofty spiritual goals and heavenly ideas. The first use of the modern sense of platonic love is considered to be by Ficino in one of his letters.

Though Plato's discussions of love originally centered on relationships which were sexual between members of the same sex, scholar Todd Reeser studies how the meaning of platonic love in Plato's original sense underwent a transformation during the Renaissance, leading to the contemporary sense of nonsexual heterosexual love.

== Other modern interpretations ==
=== Queerplatonic love ===
Some in the aromantic and asexual communities, within the broader LGBT community, have coined the term "queerplatonic" to refer to formal intimate relationships between significant others that do not involve romance. Queerplatonic feelings are often described, like romance, as involving a deeper and more profound emotional connection than friendship.

Julie Sondra Decker writes that queerplatonic love often "looks indistinguishable from romance when outside the equation", but should not be "assigned a romantic status if participants say it is not romantic". She also notes that it can also be misread by observers as close friendship in circumstances where overtly romantic gestures are socially expected. For Decker, the essence of queerplatonic attraction is its ambiguous position in relation to normative categories: she writes that QPR "is a platonic relationship, but it is 'queered' in some way—not friends, not romantic partners, but something else".

=== Evolutionary theory ===
In 2003, Lisa Diamond suggested that adult pair bonding is an exaptation of the affectional bond between infants and caregivers, using this to explain phenomena such as romantic friendships and "platonic" infatuations, or i.e. "romantic" passion without sexual desire. Some instances of this are reported by Dorothy Tennov in her study of "limerence" (i.e. love madness, commonly for an unreachable person), in which a younger woman who otherwise considered herself heterosexual would have this type of reaction towards an older woman. Among other examples are schoolgirls falling "violently in love with each other, and suffering all the pangs of unrequited attachment, desperate jealousy etc." (historically called a "smash"), and Native American men who seemed to fall in love with each other and form intense, but non-sexual bonds. Helen Fisher's theory that sexual desire is a separate system from romantic love and attachment is also given as theoretical evidence. Diamond argues that romantic love without sexual desire can even happen in contradiction to one's sexual orientation: because it would not have been adaptive for a parent to only be able to bond with an opposite sex child, so the systems must have evolved independently from sexual orientation. People most often fall in love because of sexual desire, but Diamond suggests time spent together and physical touch can serve as a substitute. Diamond believes the connection between romantic love and sexual desire is "bidirectional" in that either one can cause the other to occur because of shared oxytocin pathways in the brain.

== See also ==
- Cross-sex friendship – Friendship between an unrelated male and female
- Fraternization – Establishment of personal relations
- Friendship – Mutual affection between people
- Friend zone – Inability to move from a platonic relationship into a romantic one
- Greek love – Antiquated euphemism for male homosexuality
- Homosociality – Socializing with the same sex
- Heterosociality – Socializing with the opposite sex
- Queerplatonic relationship – Non-romantic intimate partnerships
- Relationship anarchy – Belief that relationships should be unbound by rules except those with a mutual agreement
- Romantic friendship – Very close; non-sexual relationship between friends
- Storge – Ancient Greek word for affection
- Theories of love – Psychological and sociological theories
- Theory of forms – Philosophical theory attributed to Plato
- Work spouse – Co-worker of a special relationship

== Bibliography ==
- Dall'Orto, Giovanni (January 1989). "'Socratic Love' as a Disguise for Same-Sex Love in the Italian Renaissance". Journal of Homosexuality. 16 (1–2): 33–66. doi:10.1300/J082v16n01_03. PMID 3069924.
- Gerard, Kent; Hekma, Gert (1989). The Pursuit of Sodomy: Male Homosexuality in Renaissance and Enlightenment Europe. New York: Harrington Park Press. ISBN 978-0-918393-49-4.
- K. Sharpe, Criticism and Compliment. Cambridge, 1987, ch. 2.
- T. Reeser, Setting Plato Straight: Translating Platonic Sexuality in the Renaissance. Chicago, 2015.
- Messman, S. J., Hause, D. J., & Hause, K. S. (2000). "Motives to Remain Platonic, Equity, and the Use of Maintenance Strategies in Opposite-Sex Friendships." Journal of Social and Personal Relationships, 17 (1), 67–94. doi:10.1177/0265407500171004
- Mish, F. C. (Ed.). (1993). Merriam-Webster's collegiate dictionary: Tenth Edition. Springfield, MA: Merriam-Webster, Inc. ISBN 08-7779-709-9.
- Rojcewicz, R. (1997). "Platonic love: dasein's urge toward being." Research in Phenomenology, 27 (1), 103.
- Miller, P. A. (2013). "Duras and platonic love: The erotics of substitution." Comparatist, 37 83–104.
- Benardete, S. (1986). Plato's Symposium. Chicago, IL: University of Chicago Press. ISBN 0-226-04275-8.
- Herrmann, F. (2013). "Dynamics of vision in Plato's thought." Helios, 40 (1/2), 281–307.
- Beam, Joe (2013). The Art of Falling in Love. Simon and Schuster. ISBN 978-1-4516-7265-7.
- Brehm, Sharon S. (1985). Intimate Relationships. Random House. ISBN 978-0-394-33588-9. Readable on Internet Archive.
- Hendrick, Susan S.; Hendrick, Clyde (10 June 1992). Romantic Love. SAGE Publications. ISBN 978-0-8039-3671-3. Readable on Internet Archive.
- Lee, John Alan (1973). Colours of Love: An Exploration of the Ways of Loving. New Press. ISBN 978-0-88770-187-0.
- Tennov, Dorothy (1999). Love and Limerence: The Experience of Being in Love. Lanham, MD: Scarborough House. ISBN 978-0-8128-6286-7.
