= Limerence =

Love madness or intense infatuation

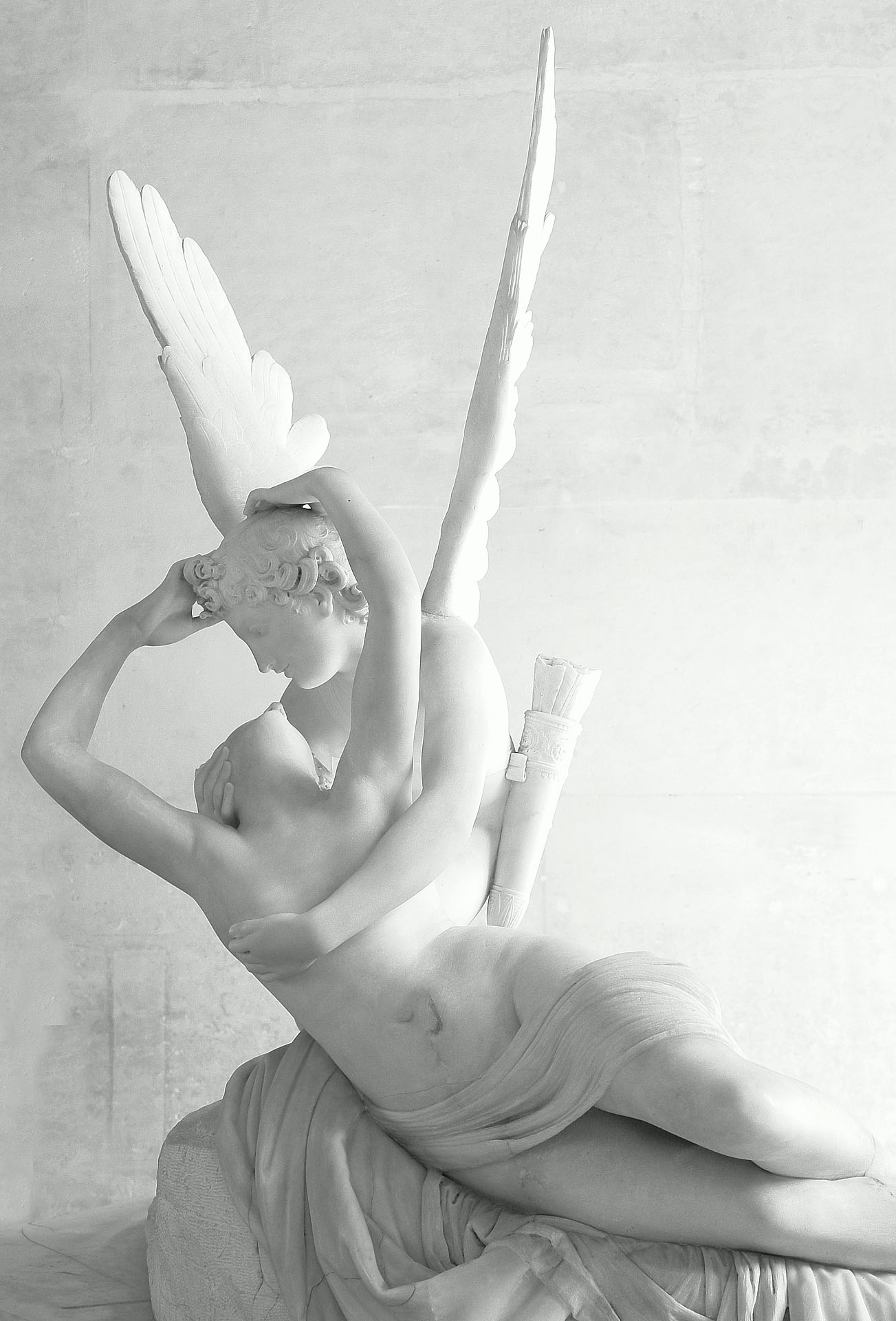
Psyche Revived by Cupid's Kiss, by Antonio Canova, first version 1787–1793

Limerence is the mental state of being madly in love or intensely infatuated when reciprocation of the feeling is uncertain. This state is characterized by intrusive thoughts and idealization of the loved one (also called "crystallization"), typically with a desire for reciprocation to form a relationship. This is accompanied by feelings of ecstasy or despair, depending on whether one's feelings seem to be reciprocated or not.

Limerence can be distinguished from other forms of romantic love using the model of obsessive and harmonious romantic passion: limerence is an obsessive passion—defined as entailing a relative lack of control, and preventing full concentration on other activities. Research on the biology of romantic love indicates that intense romantic love such as this (also called passionate love) resembles addiction during the early stage or when unreciprocated, but academics do not currently agree on how love addictions are defined.

The psychologist Dorothy Tennov coined the term "limerence" as an alteration of the word "amorance" without other etymologies. The concept grew out of her work in the 1960s when she interviewed over 500 people on the topic of love, originally published in her book Love and Limerence. According to Tennov, "to be in a state of limerence is to feel what is usually termed 'being in love.'" She coined the term to disambiguate the state from less overwhelming emotions and to avoid the implication that people who don't experience it are incapable of love. Tennov was inspired to study romantic love after encountering people in her post as a professor who experienced severe heartbreak and personal perils. Tennov's research suggested to her that limerence is normal (although illogical), and a 2025 survey suggested that as many as 50–60% of the population had experienced it.

Limerence is a descriptive concept, rather than a diagnosis or disorder; it is not in the DSM. The polysemous nature of love words has led to semantic confusion which Tennov meant to clarify, although there is even still disagreement on how "limerence" is defined. Love research has never adopted a unified terminology or definitions. According to Tennov and others, limerence can be considered intense romantic love, falling in love, love madness, intense infatuation, or lovesickness. Limerence and obsessive love are similar, but obsessive love has connotations of possessive and self-defeating behavior. Limerence is also sometimes compared to and contrasted with a crush, with limerence being more intense and impacting day-to-day functioning more: "when a crush has taken over your life".

Love and Limerence has been called the seminal work on romantic love, (Note: Tennov's research (published in 1979) pertained specifically to the mental state of infatuation, which certain researchers consider the same as passionate or romantic love (defined as a mental state). Before Tennov's research, romantic love was only the subject of speculation in early interpersonal attraction publications by Elaine Hatfield and others. John Alan Lee was also researching love around the same time as Tennov, and published his color wheel theory in 1973. Lee developed the first scientific method for distinguishing different kinds of love in 1970.) with Tennov's survey results and the various personal accounts recounted in the book largely marking the start of data collection on the phenomenon.

== Overview ==
Dorothy Tennov's research was intended to be a scientific attempt at understanding the nature of romantic love. She identified a suite of psychological properties associated with a state she called limerence—usually termed "being in love", but distinguishable from other types of attraction patterns that the phrase "in love" might also refer to. Other authors have considered limerence to be an emotional and motivational state for focusing attention on a preferred mating partner or an attachment process.

Joe Beam calls limerence the feeling of being "madly in love". Nicky Hayes describes it as "a kind of infatuated, all-absorbing passion", the type of love Dante felt towards Beatrice or that of Romeo and Juliet. An unfulfilled, intense longing defines the state, where the individual becomes "more or less obsessed by that person and spends much of their time fantasising about them". Hayes suggests it is "the unobtainable nature of the goal which makes the feeling so powerful", and occasional, intermittent reinforcement may be required to support the underlying feelings. Arthur and Elaine Aron describe a "constant, overwhelming, and even debilitating absorption in the unrequited desire" of limerence. Stanton Peele compares it to "severe emotional disability", with an often inappropriate love object. Frank Tallis calls it "love that does not need liking—love that may even thrive in response to rejection or contempt" and notes the "striking similarities" with addiction.

A central feature of limerence, for Tennov, was that her participants really saw the personal flaws of the object of their affection but overlooked them or found them attractive. Tennov calls this "crystallization", after a description by the French writer Stendhal. This "crystallized" object of passionate desire is what Tennov calls a "limerent object" (LO), "because to the degree that your reaction to a person is limerent, you respond to your construction of LO's qualities".

Limerence has psychological properties akin to the concept of passionate love, but in Tennov's conception, limerence begins before an intimate relationship and before the person experiencing it knows for certain whether it is reciprocated. Limerence is frequently unrequited and turns into a lovesickness that can be difficult to escape. Tennov argues that some situational uncertainty is required for the mental preoccupation and feelings to intensify, for example: mixed messages, physical or social obstacles, or even an LO's unsuitability as a partner.

Not everyone experiences limerence. Tennov estimated that 50% of women and 35% of men experience limerence based on answers to certain survey questions she administered. Another survey administered by the neuroscientist Tom Bellamy indicated that 64% had experienced it at least once, and 32% "found it so distressing that it was hard to enjoy life".

It can be difficult for people who have not experienced limerence to understand it, and it is often derided and dismissed as pathology, or an invention of romantic fiction. According to Tennov, limerence is not a mental illness, although it can be "highly disruptive and extremely painful", called "irrational, silly, embarrassing, and abnormal" or sometimes "the greatest happiness" depending on who is asked.

== Components ==
The original components of limerence were:

- intrusive thinking about the object of your passionate desire (the limerent object or "LO"), who is a possible sexual partner
- acute longing for reciprocation
- dependency of mood on LO's actions or, more accurately, your interpretation of LO's actions with respect to the probability of reciprocation
- inability to react limerently to more than one person at a time (exceptions occur only when limerence is at low ebb—early on or in the last fading)
- some fleeting and transient relief from unrequited limerent passion through vivid imagination of action by LO that means reciprocation
- fear of rejection and sometimes incapacitating but always unsettling shyness in LO's presence, especially in the beginning and whenever uncertainty strikes
- intensification through adversity (at least, up to a point)
- acute sensitivity to any act or thought or condition that can be interpreted favorably, and an extraordinary ability to devise or invent "reasonable" explanations for why the neutrality that the disinterested observer might see is in fact a sign of hidden passion in the LO
- an aching of the "heart" (a region in the center front of the chest) when uncertainty is strong
- buoyancy (a feeling of walking on air) when reciprocation seems evident
- a general intensity of feeling that leaves other concerns in the background
- a remarkable ability to emphasize what is truly admirable in LO and to avoid dwelling on the negative, even to respond with a compassion for the negative and render it, emotionally if not perceptually, into another positive attribute.
— Dorothy Tennov, Love and Limerence: The Experience of Being in Love

== Famous examples ==
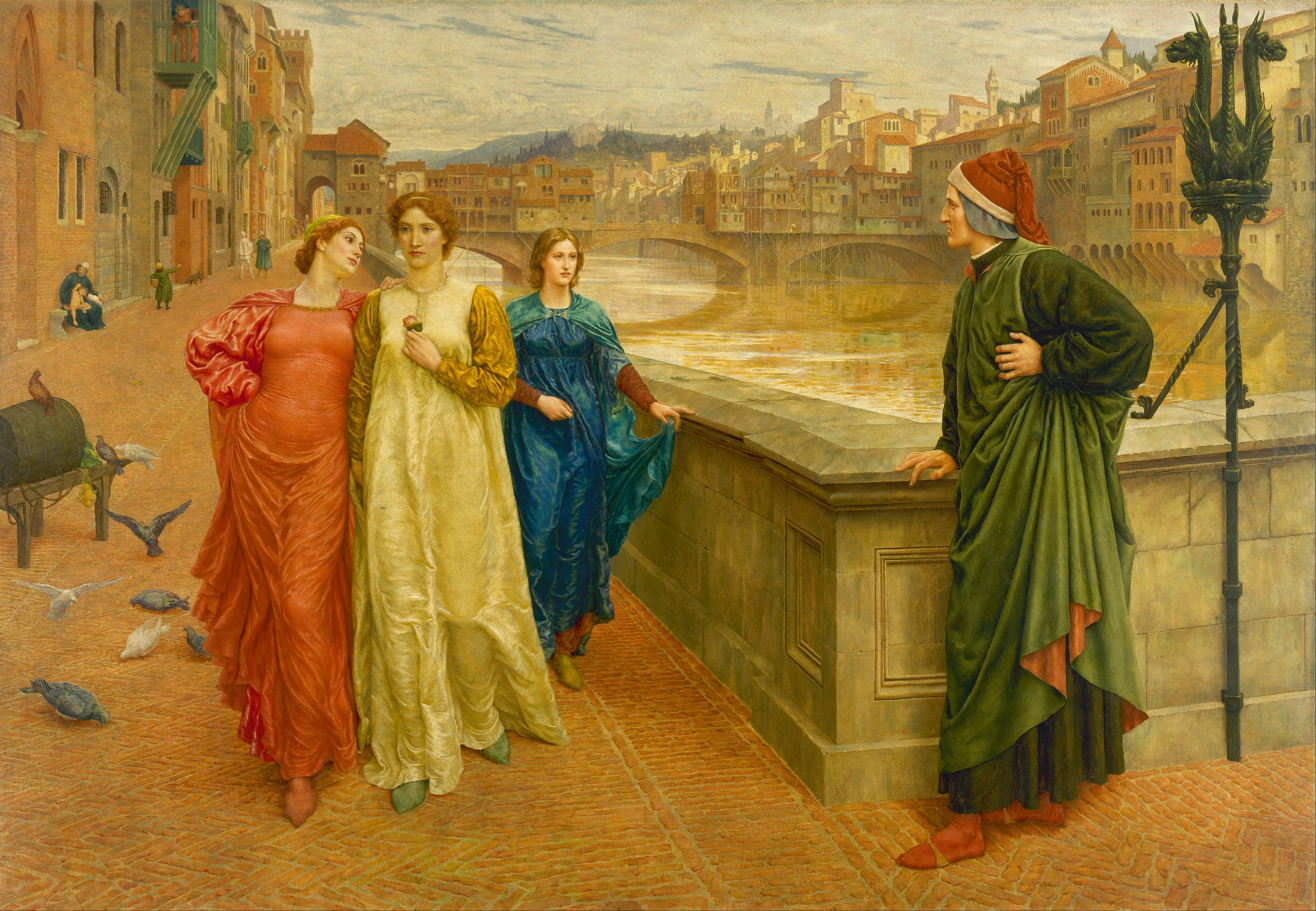
Dante and Beatrice, by Henry Holiday, depicts Beatrice refusing to speak to Dante, an event which according to Dante left him so overcome with sorrow that he bitterly cried himself to sleep, "like a little child [...] after it has been beaten".

=== Historical ===
- Stendhal, whom Love and Limerence is written in memory of, and his unrequited love for a woman named Mathilde, which inspired him to write De l'Amour—the only comprehensive approach to limerence which Tennov could find at the time of her research
- Dante Alighieri's unending but unrequited love for Beatrice Portinari, who was a real person, despite Dante's account being fictionalized
- Lady Caroline Lamb and Lord Byron, who shared an affair that Byron dropped out of, with Lamb remaining obsessed for a time afterward
- Heloise, the 17-year-old mistress of the 12th-century cleric-philosopher Peter Abelard, who was castrated by hoodlums ordered by Heloise's uncle, who mistakenly believed Abelard had abandoned her. Heloise's limerence for Abelard remained intense for many years after their marriage and subsequent separation, depicted in the Letters of Abelard and Heloise

=== Fictional ===
- Romeo and Juliet
- Werther, from The Sorrows of Young Werther
- Mr. Darcy, from Pride and Prejudice
- Severus Snape's love for Lily Evans, the mother of Harry Potter
- Joel Barish, from Eternal Sunshine of the Spotless Mind
- Bella Swan and Edward Cullen, from the Twilight series
- Tom Hansen, from 500 Days of Summer

== Relation to other concepts ==
=== Love ===
Dorothy Tennov gives several reasons for inventing a term for the state denoted by limerence (usually termed "being in love"). One principal reason is to resolve ambiguities with the word "love" being used both to refer to an act (which is chosen), as well as to a state (which is endured):

Many writers on love have complained about semantic difficulties. The dictionary lists two dozen different meanings of the word "love". And how does one distinguish between love and affection, liking, fondness, caring, concern, infatuation, attraction, or desire? [...] Acknowledgment of a distinction between love as a verb, as an action taken by the individual, and love as a state is awkward. Never having fallen in love is not at all a matter of not loving, if loving is defined as caring. Furthermore, this state of "being in love" included feelings that do not properly fit with love defined as concern.

(The type of love that focuses on caring for others is called compassionate love or agape.)

Another reason given is that she encountered people who do not experience limerence. The first such person Tennov discovered was a long-time friend, Helen Payne, whose unfamiliarity with the state emerged during a conversation on an airplane flight together. Tennov writes that "describing the intricacies of romantic attachments" to Helen was "like trying to describe the color red to one blind from birth". A person not currently experiencing limerence is called "nonlimerent", but Tennov cautions that it seemed to her that there is no "nonlimerent personality" and that potentially anyone could experience limerence. Tennov says:

I adopted the view that never being in this state was neither more nor less pathological than experiencing it. I wanted to be able to speak about this reliably identifiable condition without giving love's advocates the feeling something precious was being destroyed. Even more important, if using the term "love" denoted the presence of the state, there was the danger that absence of the state would receive negative connotations.

Tennov addresses the issue of whether limerence is love in other passages. In one passage she clearly says that limerence is love, at least in certain cases:

In fully developed limerence, you feel additionally what is, in other contexts as well, called love—an extreme degree of feeling that you want LO to be safe, cared for, happy, and all those other positive and noble feelings [...]. That's probably why limerence is called love in all languages. [...] Surely limerence is love at its highest and most glorious peak.

However, Tennov switches in tone and continues on with a fairly negative story of the pain felt by a woman reminiscing over the time she wasted pining for a man she now feels nothing towards, something which occupied her in a time when her father was still alive and her children "were adorable babies who needed their mother's attention." Tennov says this is why we distinguish limerence (this "love") from other loves. In another passage, Tennov says that while affection and fondness do not demand anything in return, the return of feelings desired in the limerent state means that "Other aspects of your life, including love, are sacrificed in behalf of the all-consuming need." and that "While limerence has been called love, it is not love."

The philosopher Carrie Jenkins says that despite often being called "falling in love" by scientists, philosophers, and in common parlance, the irrational state of limerence is a "terrible candidate" to play the role of love because of its potential to be experienced for a person who is not known at all or even disliked; love by comparison is supposed to be one of the best things in life.

=== Romantic love ===
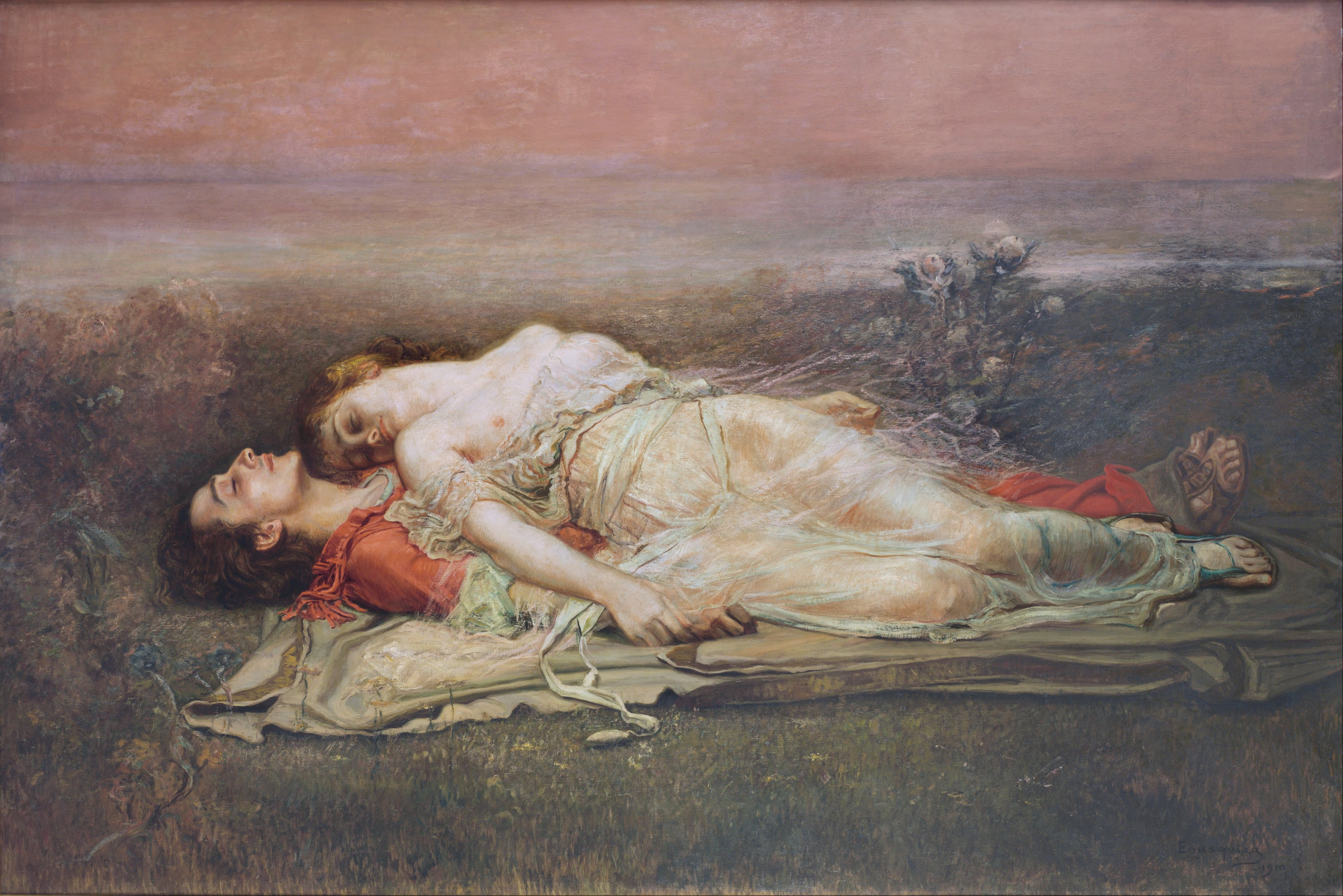
Tristan and Isolde (Death), by Rogelio de Egusquiza. In this myth, the two drink a love potion by mistake, when Iseult is due to be married to Tristan's uncle, a king. In one version of the story, Tristan dies of a broken heart after a signal sent by Iseult is miscommunicated to him as a rejection. In another version, Tristan is mortally wounded but Iseult cannot save him and gives up her spirit. The story is said to be the quintessential courtly romance.

Dorothy Tennov sometimes considers limerence to be synonymous with "romantic love", a term with a complicated history and definition. A cultural ancestor to Tennov's concept was the literary tradition of romantic love, involving often tragic or unfulfilled love, or early depictions of limerence. Literature and poetry provided early self-reports of the kind of experience Tennov was interested in studying. Some examples of romantic love stories in this vein are Layla and Majnun, Tristan and Iseult, Dante and Beatrice (from La Vita Nuova), Romeo and Juliet and The Sorrows of Young Werther. Anakin and Padmé from Star Wars are a modern depiction.

The literary genre dates back to troubadour poetry from the Middle Ages (or earlier), also known as "courtly love". Tennov credits Andreas Capellanus as describing limerence "very accurately" in The Art of Courtly Love, a book of statutes for the "proper" conduct of lovers. The work includes rules such as "A true lover is constantly and without intermission possessed by the thoughts of his beloved." and "The easy attainment of love makes it of little value; difficulty of attainment makes it prized." The work is believed to have helped spread romantic love culture throughout Europe. Romantic love in this sense is sometimes held to be socially constructed (often by critics), but Tennov argues that limerence has a biological basis.

Tennov sometimes considers limerence synonymous with "falling in love", a concept which also has origins in the romantic tradition and the idea that love is tragic—evoking a connotation of physically falling over or losing consciousness.

"Romantic love" originally referenced this courtly idea, but then came to have other connotations. In modern scientific literature, "romantic love" is instead often used as a synonym for "passionate love", a more general concept, also often associated with limerence. (Note: In her era, Tennov called the scientific literature "confused and contradictory". John Alan Lee has also complained about the reduction to a monolithic typology, or "one true love". Helen Fisher (who thinks there is no difference between limerence and romantic love) has commented that she prefers the term "romantic love" for its meaning in society.)

=== Passionate and companionate love ===
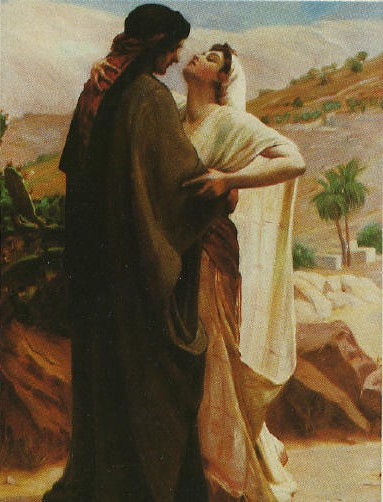
Passionate Encounter

La Promenade

Limerence is often associated with "passionate love", with Elaine Hatfield considering them synonymous, and commenting in 2016 that they're "much the same". Many researchers have considered them synonymous. Passionate love is:

A state of intense longing for union with an other. Reciprocated love (union with the other) is associated with fulfillment and ecstasy. Unrequited love (separation) with emptiness; with anxiety, or despair. A state of profound physiological arousal.

Passionate love is linked to passion, as in intense emotion: for example, joy and fulfillment, but also anguish and agony. According to Hatfield, passion is a "hodgepodge of conflicting emotions", and the original meaning "was agony—as in Christ's passion." Hatfield conceived of passionate love as an intense experience, capturing many features of limerence or the mania love style. Passionate love is commonly contrasted with companionate love, "the affection we feel for those with whom our lives are deeply entwined".

In Love and Limerence, Dorothy Tennov also lists passionate love among her synonyms for limerence, and refers to Hatfield's early writings on the concept. Tennov's study, however, focused on the aspects of love which cause distress, and on individuals over relationships. Another problem she encountered in her research was that informants would use terms like "passionate love", "romantic love" and "being in love" to refer to mental states other than what she refers to as limerence. Informants would use the word "obsession", yet not report the intrusive thoughts of limerence, only that "thoughts of the person are frequent and pleasurable".

Passionate love is commonly measured with the Passionate Love Scale (PLS), which has been thought of as measuring the state denoted by limerence. However, research found that the PLS actually has two general components, obsessive and non-obsessive. Limerence is then compared to the obsessional element of passionate love (characterized by intrusive thinking, uncertainty, and mood swings). This research additionally found that love feelings without obsession can actually sustain in a relationship longer than previously thought.

=== Infatuation ===
"Infatuation" has been used interchangeably with terms like passionate love, "being in love" and limerence. However, Dorothy Tennov did not use the term "infatuation" because despite conceptual overlap, she says it evokes different connotations. Colloquially, infatuation suggests irrationality and capriciousness. In Love and Limerence, Tennov considers "infatuation" to be pejorative, for example, being used to label obsessive teenage fantasy over a celebrity which is actually limerence.

In the triangular theory of love, by Robert Sternberg, "infatuation" refers to passion without intimacy (closeness) or commitment, which he has stated is essentially the same as limerence, and can be quite long-lasting in some circumstances.

=== Independent emotion systems ===
Helen Fisher's popular theory of independent emotion systems posits that there are three primary systems involved with human reproduction, mating and parenting: lust (the sex drive, or sexual desire), attraction (passionate love, infatuation or limerence) and attachment (companionate love). These three systems regularly work in concert together but serve different purposes and can also work independently. According to Fisher, lust, attraction and attachment can occur in any order. Independent emotions theory has been critiqued as being oversimplified, but the general idea of separate systems remains useful.

When limerence is a component in an affair, for example, Fisher's theory can be used to help explain this. Fisher's theory is that a person can feel deep attachment for a long-term spouse, while they're in limerence with somebody else, while they can be sexually attracted to still yet other people. Joe Beam comments that if somebody in a committed relationship ends up in limerence like this, it will pull them out of their relationship.

Fisher's theory has also been used to explain "platonic" limerence (without sexual desire), because romantic love and sexual desire are functionally distinct. Tennov encountered this occasionally in her own research, finding cases of otherwise heterosexual women experiencing limerence for an older woman (compared to "hero worship"), but dismissed it as being outside her theory. Lisa Diamond argues this is possible (even in contradiction to sexual orientation) because the brain systems evolved by repurposing the systems for mother-infant bonding (a process called exaptation). According to this theory, it would not have been adaptive for a parent to only be able to bond with an opposite sex child, so the systems must have evolved independent of sexual orientation.

=== Attachment theory ===
John Bowlby's concept of "attachment" refers to a system evolved to keep infants in proximity of their caregiver (or "attachment figure"). An attachment figure is a "secure base" for safety while exploring the environment, the child seeks proximity with the attachment figure when threatened, and suffers distress when separated. A prominent theory suggests this system is reused for adult pair bonds, as an exaptation or co-option, whereby a given trait takes on a new purpose. "Attachment style" refers to differences in thoughts and behaviors, relating to the concept of security vs. insecurity. This is split into components of anxiety (worrying the partner is available, attentive and responsive) and avoidance (preference not to rely on others or open up emotionally).

In Helen Fisher's theory, limerence and attachment are considered different systems with different purposes. In the past, it has also been suggested that limerence could be related to the anxious attachment style. However, in their original 1987 paper about this, Cindy Hazan and Phillip Shaver caution they aren't implying the early phase of romance is equivalent to being attached. Other prominent authors have also argued that attachment theory cannot replace concepts like love styles or types of love. Limerence is considered a unique state which is distinct from attachment style, although people who have an anxious attachment style are more likely to have experienced it according to one survey.

A 1990 study found considerable overlap of distributions between all three attachment styles and limerence (reported at similar frequencies), but the 15% of participants with an anxious attachment style scored about 10–20% higher on obsessive preoccupation and emotional dependence, and avoidants idealized more. Along with scoring highly on limerence, the anxious group also scored highly on the agape love attitude, for selfless, all-giving love.

=== Love styles ===
The concept of a "love style" was invented by the sociologist John Alan Lee, to distinguish between different ways to love, or different types of love stories. Limerence is considered similar or related to the love style mania (or manic love), named after the Ancient Greek theia mania (the madness from the gods). Lee developed his mania concept from sources similar to Tennov, like Andreas Capellanus and courtly love. Both Lee and Tennov refer to "love madness", and Peele & Brodsky's Love and Addiction.

A manic lover is obsessively preoccupied with the beloved. When asked to recall their childhood, a typical manic lover recalls it as unhappy, and they're usually lonely, dissatisfied adults. They're anxious to fall in love, but unsure of which physical type they prefer. Often, they fall in love with somebody quite inappropriate (a stranger, or even somebody they initially dislike) and project onto them the qualities they want but don't actually have. According to Lee, "Mania can become almost an addiction nearly impossible for the addict to end on his own initiative." Mania is often the first love style of a young person, but others may not experience it until middle age—for example, after a marriage has lost interest. According to Lee, a cycle of manic loves is often caused by a desperate need to be in love, which the manic lover must remedy to break free.

Lee describes the manic lover as jealous, but Tennov believes that a person can be limerent and not be jealous.

Among the other love styles, mania is closely comparable to eros (erotic love, or love of beauty); both are considered "romantic love". An erotic lover is also intensely preoccupied with their beloved, although the thoughts are more optimistic. An erotic lover has a specific ideal in mind of what they consider beautiful—love is not "blind" for eros. According to Lee, only manic lovers typically "crystallize", the way Stendhal described it, overlooking flaws in their beloved. The erotic lover also recalls their childhood as happy. Eros has been associated with secure attachment, while mania has been associated with attachment anxiety and neuroticism. A third style, manic eros, is a mixture "moving either toward a more stable eros or toward full-blown mania". Some are erotic lovers under a temporary strain (moving toward mania), while others are manic lovers with a self-confident and helping partner (moving toward eros).

According to Lee, the love style ludus (noncommittal love as a game, avoidance and juggling multiple partners, e.g. Don Juan) and mania possess a "fatal attraction" for one another. It's surprisingly common, but not a good match for happy, mutual love. According to Tennov, Don Juan was probably nonlimerent, "more interested in exploiting the feeling in others for his own sexual gratification", although nonlimerence doesn't necessitate this.

=== Love addiction ===
"Love addiction" is a heterogeneous construct under discussion as a potential mental disorder, but does not yet exist in any psychiatric nosology (e.g. not in the DSM). Academics do not currently agree on when love is an addiction or when it needs to be treated. In a narrow view, love could be considered addiction only when it involves abnormal processes carrying negative consequences; alternatively, a broader view is that all love might be addiction, or simply an appetite, similar to how humans are dependent on food. Authors such as Helen Fisher have also included those "who have been rejected or broken up with" as love addicts.

Limerence has been included in this discussion, and likened to a love addiction. Stanton Peele, a pioneering author on love addiction, has commented on limerence, calling it a "clinical condition" which "leads people (primarily women) desperately to pursue often inappropriate love objects, frequently to fail at relationships, and to be incapable of learning from such experiences". Sharon Brehm has wondered what limerence would feel like "if there were a cultural tradition encouraging us to work with it rather than be assailed by it".

=== Erotomania ===
Limerence is different from erotomania, a delusional disorder where the sufferer falsely believes their love is secretly reciprocated when it is not, and invents ways to interpret outright rejections as unserious. A person in limerence by comparison might "grasp for hope" and misinterpret signals, or imagine reciprocation in a fantasy, but they will understand a rejection.

== Evolutionary purpose ==
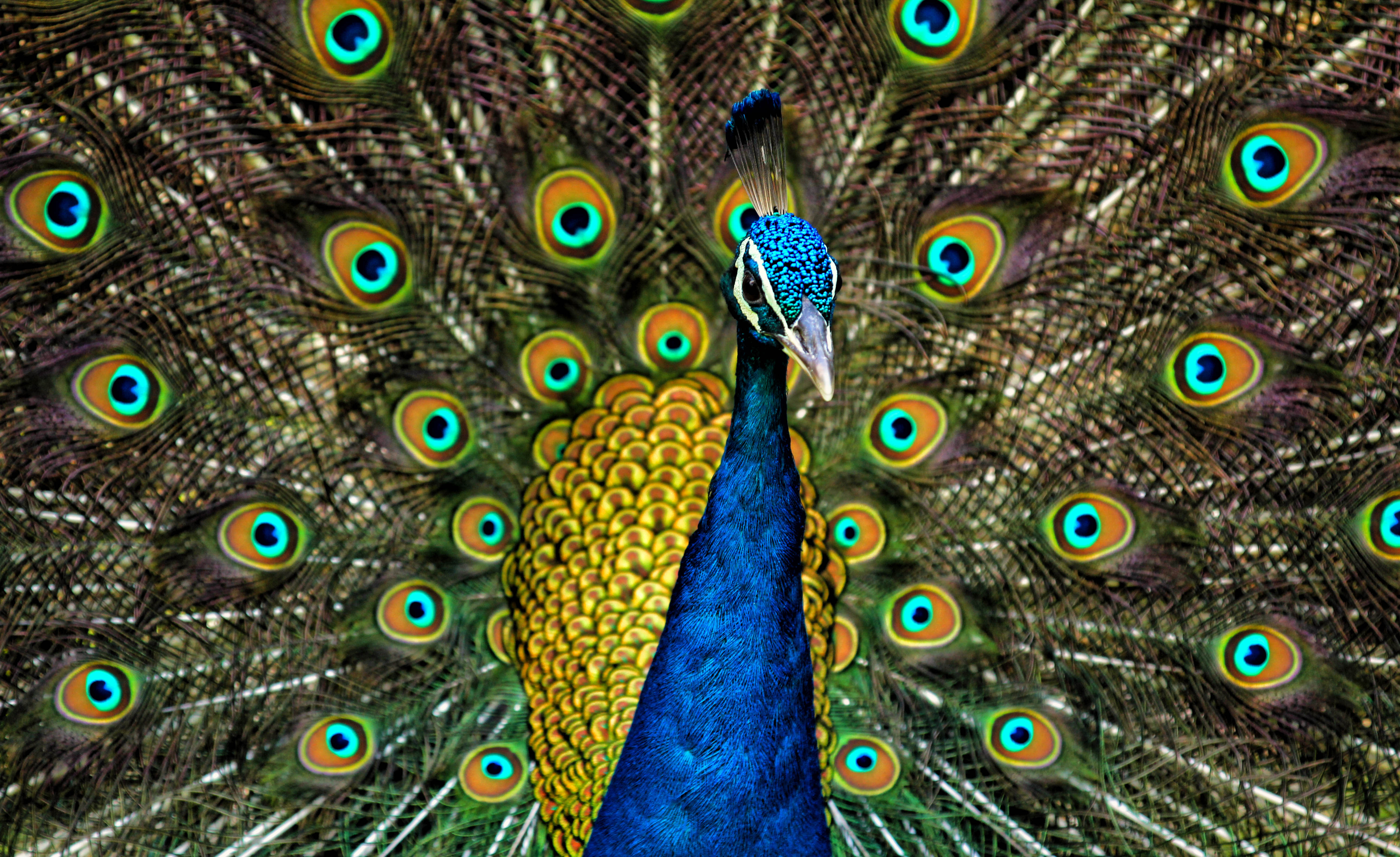
Limerence might have evolved as a handicap signal, similar to a peacock's tail, but signaling extreme commitment.

Dorothy Tennov's speculation was that limerence has an evolutionary purpose.

For what ultimate cause might the state of limerence be a proximate cause? In other words, why were people who became limerent successful, maybe more successful than others, in passing their genes on to succeeding generations[.] Did limerence evolve to cement a relationship long enough to get the offspring up and running? [...] The most consistent result of limerence is mating, not merely sexual interaction but also commitment, the establishment of a shared domicile in the form of a cozy nest built for the enjoyment of ecstasy, for reproduction, and for the rearing of children.

According to the evolutionary theory by the anthropologist Helen Fisher, limerence is the activation of a motivation system for choosing and focusing energy on a potential mating partner. This brain system evolved for mammalian mate choice, also called "courtship attraction". In this phenomenon, a preferred mating partner is chosen based on a display of physical traits (such as a peacock's tail feathers) or other behaviors. Fisher also includes the attraction to personality traits and other characteristics in her mate choice theory for humans. Who a person falls in love with then is determined by their "love map", a largely unconscious list of traits they desire in an ideal partner. Love maps begin forming during childhood based on experiences with parents and friends, among other associations, but also change over time. In most species, courtship attraction is brief, but intense romantic love can last much longer in humans. A competing evolutionary theory to Fisher's is that courtship attraction only encompasses something like love at first sight attraction, and the obsessive thoughts and intense attraction associated with early-stage romantic love instead evolved by co-opting (or re-using) the brain systems for mother-infant bonding. In this theory, romantic love may serve the function of mate choice but the brain systems were not originally for this.

The neuroscientist Tom Bellamy believes that limerence evolved as a form of high-risk "extreme pair bonding" which can be explained as a handicap signal. The handicap principle in evolutionary theory is based on a contention between honest and fake signaling. When real emotions evolve, a niche is created for sham emotions (e.g. fake facial expressions) which are less risky to express. One explanation for why honest signals can evolve without becoming worthless (because of competing fakers) is that the honest signal can evolve if it's too expensive to fake. One example in nature is the peacock's tail, an example of conspicuous consumption, a cumbersome display which consumes nutrients. Only a healthy peacock can afford it, so in that case it may have evolved because it was a handicap, and used by females of the species as an indicator of health. Limerence can be seen as a handicap signal meant to prove one's true commitment to their limerent object. Limerence might have evolved to leave the person experiencing it so insanely besotted that they would not leave for another mate, even a more valuable one. According to Helen Fisher's theory, monogamy emerged at a time when mothers needed extra food and protection (when bipedalism evolved, and then infant altriciality later), so romantic love evolved to last long enough while a mother cares for an infant.

Tennov suggested that if the neural "machinery" for limerence is not a universal among all humans, then having both phenotypes (limerent and nonlimerent) in the population might be beneficial and an evolutionarily stable strategy. Limerents and nonlimerents tend not to always get along, nor have compatible relationship interests. Limerence would also be affected by culture, according to Tennov. A culture which idealizes limerence might cause the nonlimerent LO to be more tolerant (or even imitate it), whereas a culture which is hostile to limerence might cause it to be denied, hidden or suppressed.

== Characteristics ==
=== Addiction ===
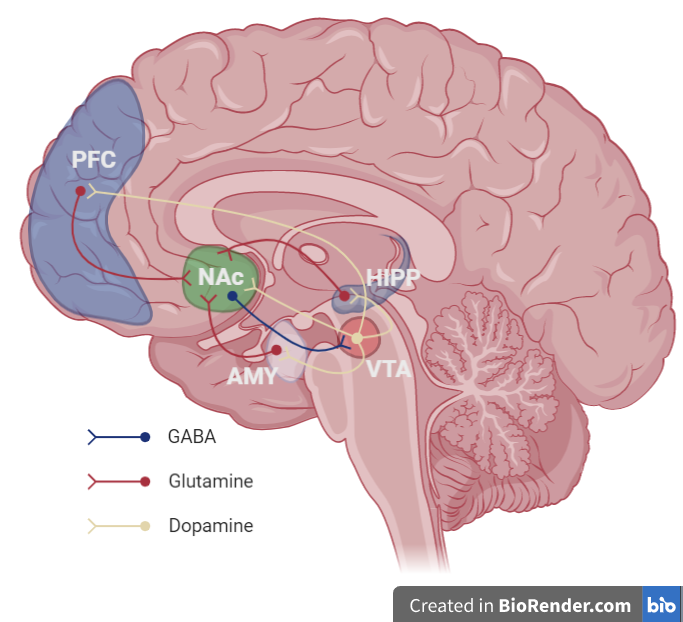
Key connections in the mesocorticolimbic pathway.

Limerence has been called an addiction. Romantic love in the intense early stage (or unreciprocated) is being compared to a behavioral addiction (i.e. addiction to a non-substance) but the "substance" involved is the loved person. A team led by Helen Fisher used fMRI to find that people who had "just fallen madly in love" showed activation in an area of the brain called the ventral tegmental area (VTA) while looking at a photograph of their beloved. The VTA is an area in the midbrain which produces dopamine and projects to other reward system areas, like the nucleus accumbens and caudate nucleus which have also been active in brain scans of romantic love. Dopamine signaling in the VTA is the origin of a phenomenon called incentive salience, also called "wanting" (in quotes). This is the property by which cues in the environment stand out to a person and become attention-grabbing and attractive, like a "motivational magnet" which pulls a person towards a particular reward. People in love are thought to experience incentive salience in response to their beloved.

In addiction research, a distinction is drawn between "wanting" a reward (i.e. incentive salience, tied to mesocorticolimbic dopamine) and "liking" a reward (i.e. pleasure, tied to hedonic hotspots), aspects which are dissociable. People can be addicted to drugs and compulsively seek them out, even when taking the drug no longer results in a high or the addiction is detrimental to one's life. They can also "want" (i.e. feel compelled towards, in the sense of incentive salience) something which they do not cognitively wish for. In a similar way, people who are in love may "want" a loved person even when interactions with them are not pleasurable. For example, they may want to contact an ex-partner after a rejection, even when the experience will only be painful. It is also possible for a person to be "in love" with somebody they do not like, or who treats them poorly. Fisher's team proposes that romantic love is a "positive addiction" (i.e. not harmful) when requited and a "negative addiction" when unrequited or inappropriate.

For a person in limerence that goes unrequited, the pleasurable aspects tend to diminish over time, with the person becoming lovesick and the addiction being maintained more by avoidance of the pain of separation.

=== Lovesickness ===
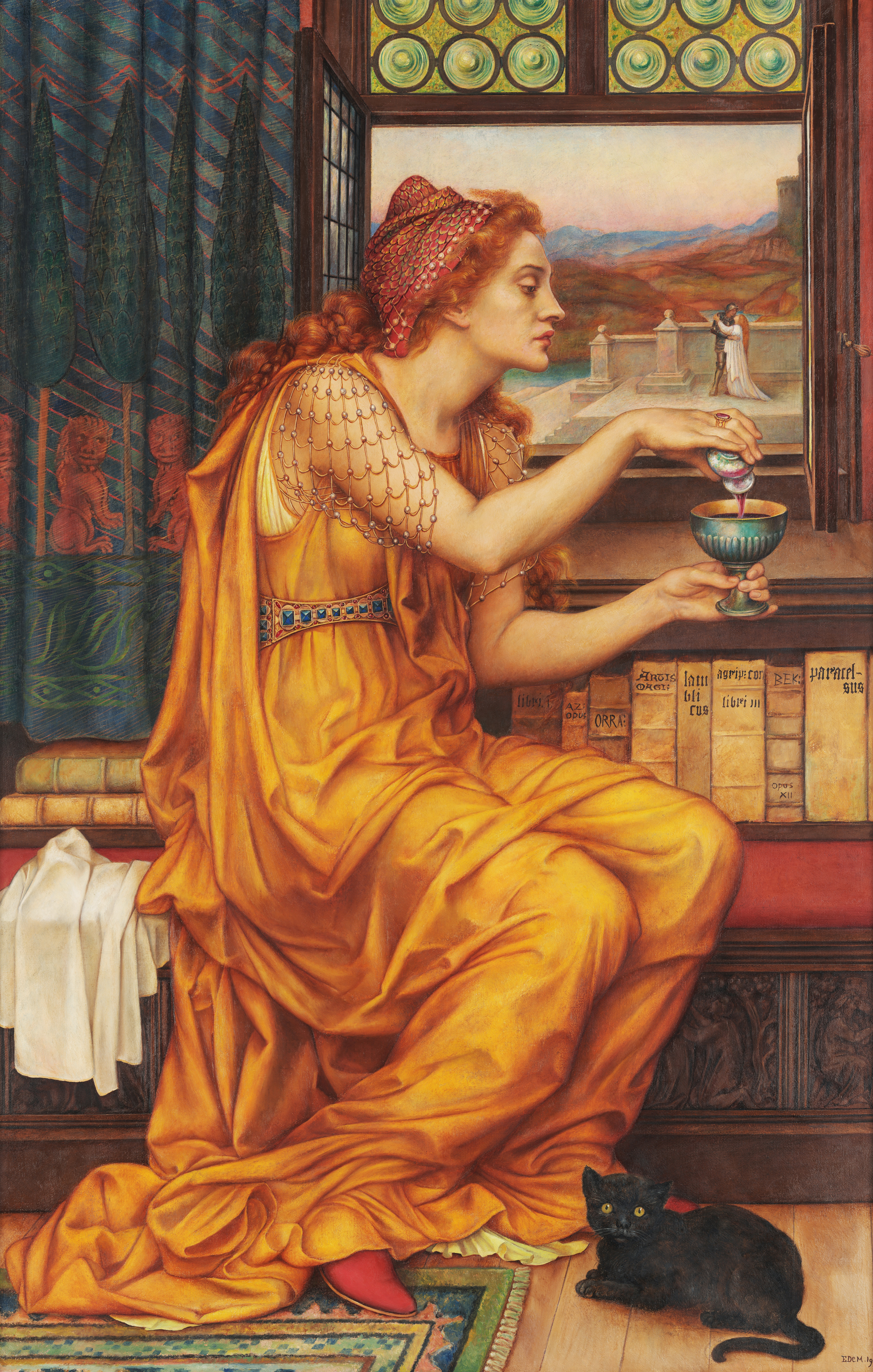
The Love Potion, by Evelyn De Morgan. According to Tennov, "the love potion’s ingredients remain secret. Limerence is unaffected by the intensity of our desire to call it into or out of existence at our wills.", but she asks "Is the love potion a hormone?"

Usually limerence is unrequited, and a horrible experience for the limerent person, even debilitating for some. Lovesickness is the resulting mental state, characterized by addictive cravings, frustration, depression, melancholy and intrusive thinking. In Dorothy Tennov's survey group, 42% reported being "severely depressed about a love affair" and 17% said they "often thought of committing suicide". Helen Fisher's fMRI scans of rejected lovers showed activation in brain areas associated with physical pain, craving and assessing one's gains and losses. A limerent person can self-isolate, or be distracted, even to the detriment of school or job performance.

A shyness and confusion manifests out of fear of rejection when an LO is around—sometimes even in those normally confident, with the limerent person "terribly worried that [their] own actions may bring about disaster". A 28-year-old truck driver says it's "like what you might call stage fright [...]. I was awkward as hell." The physiological effects of limerence include trembling, pallor, flushing, weakness, sweating, butterflies in the stomach and a pounding heart. When Tennov asked her informants where the sensation of limerence was felt, "they pointed unerringly to the midpoint in their chest. So consistently did this occur that it would seem to be another indication that the state described is indeed limerence".

In a 1987 survey by Shere Hite in which many participants described relationships which were clearly limerent, 69% of married women and 48% of single women "neither liked, nor trusted, being in love", and their responses indicated being in love was mostly distressing. 17% "could no longer take love seriously". Tennov describes being under the spell herself: "Before it happened, I couldn't have imagined it[.] Now, I wouldn't want to have it happen again." Some people even described to her incidents of self-harm, but Tennov maintains that such tragedies involve limerence "augmented and distorted" by other factors.

There is debate among academics over when love can be considered addiction, and whether addiction is really a "true" mental illness. Lovesickness has been pathologized in previous centuries, but is not currently in the ICD-10, ICPC or DSM-5. The lovers described by Tennov bear a particular resemblance to addicts, but limerence was not intended to denote an abnormal state. The author and clinical psychologist Frank Tallis has made the argument that all love—even normal love—is largely indistinguishable from mental illness. According to Tallis, "a 'clinically significant' amount of distress and general impairment are an almost inevitable consequence of falling in love".

For should I see thee a little moment,
Straight is my voice hushed;
Yea, my tongue is broken, and
through and through me
'Neath the flesh, impalpable fire
runs tingling;
Nothing see mine eyes, and a
voice of roaring
Waves in my ear sounds;
Sweat runs down in rivers, a
tremor seizes
All my limbs, and paler than
grass in autumn,
Caught by pains of menacing
death, I falter,
Lost in the love-trance.

— Sappho

The symptoms of lovesickness still bear resemblance to entries in the DSM, which now includes some addictions, and there are other entries which also resemble core symptoms of falling in love: preoccupation, episodes of melancholy, rapture and instability of mood. These correspond to conventional diagnoses of obsessionality (or OCD), depression, mania (or hypomania) and manic depression. Other examples are physical symptoms resembling panic attacks (pounding heart, trembling, shortness of breath and lightheadedness), excessive worrying about the future resembling generalized anxiety disorder, appetite disturbance and sensitivity about one's appearance resembling anorexia nervosa, and the feeling that life has become a dream resembling derealization and depersonalization.

It has been argued that falling in love is involuntary, but whether one's subsequent behavior could be considered autonomous may depend on whether addictive love is viewed as a normal or abnormal state. Tallis argues that love evolved to override rationality so that one finds a lover to reproduce with, regardless of the personal costs of bearing and raising a child:

At first sight, it seems extraordinary that evolutionary forces might conspire to shape something that looks like a mental illness to ensure reproductive success. Yet, there are many reasons why love should have evolved to share with madness several features—the most notable of which is the loss of reason. Like the ancient humoral model of love sickness, evolutionary principles seem to have necessitated a blurring of the distinction between normal and abnormal states. Evolution expects us to love madly, lest we fail to love at all.

According to Tennov, "Love has been called a madness and an affliction at least since the time of the ancient Greeks and probably earlier than that." Historically, lovesickness has been attributed to arrows shot by Eros, a sickness entering through the eyes (like evil eye), excess of black bile, spells, potions and other magic. The first known treatise on the subject is Remedia Amoris, by the poet Ovid. People have tried to treat lovesickness with a variety of natural products, charms and rituals. The bioethicist Brian Earp and his colleagues have argued that the voluntary use of anti-love drugs (made to cause a person to fall out of love) could be ethical, but there's no drug now which is a realistic candidate.

=== Intrusive thinking and fantasy ===
The obsessional features of passionate love (as in limerence) have been compared to OCD since the late 1990s, although with differences. Unlike OCD, limerence starts with a period of intoxicating joy, and only later reaches a state of anxiety when unrequited. The thoughts also differ in function and content. In addiction, the early stage starts with positive reinforcement (binging and intoxication), but over time a transition occurs towards a more compulsive stage of negative reinforcement (avoiding withdrawal). This later stage (of negative reinforcement) is a possible parallel with OCD (where compulsions relieve tension or anxiety).

Intrusive thinking is a hallmark or cardinal trait of romantic love. Tennov wrote that "Limerence is first and foremost a condition of cognitive obsession." One study found that on average people in love spent 65% of their waking hours thinking of their beloved. Arthur Aron says "It is obsessive-compulsive when you're feeling it. It's the center of your life." At the height of obsessive fantasy, a person in limerence can spend 85 to nearly 100% of their days and nights doting in reverie, lose their ability to focus and become distracted.

A limerent person can spend time fantasizing about future events even if they never come true, as the anticipation on its own yields dopamine. According to Tennov, limerent fantasy is unsatisfactory unless rooted in reality, because the fantasy must seem realistic enough to be somewhat possible. Fantasies can nevertheless be wildly unrealistic: one person recalled an elaborate rescue, in which he saves an LO's 5-year-old cousin from motorcycles, only to be killed by a snake in the lap of his LO as she tells him "I love you". This fantasizing along with the replaying of actual memories forms a bridge between ordinary life and the eventual hoped-for moment: consummation. Tennov says that limerent fantasy is "inescapable", something that just "happens" as opposed to something one "does".

Ellen Berscheid & Elaine Hatfield (cited by Tennov) state on the importance of fantasy:

When the lover closes his eyes and daydreams, he can summon up a flawless partner—a partner who instantaneously satisfies all his unspoken, conflicting, and fleeting desires. In fantasy he may receive unlimited reward or he may anticipate that he would receive unlimited reward were he ever to actually meet his ideal. Compared to our grandiose fantasies, the level of reward we receive in our real interactions is severely circumscribed. As a consequence, sometimes the most extreme passion is aroused by partners who exist only in imagination or partners who are barely known.

One theory of obsessive thinking draws a parallel with drug addiction: the early stage of romantic love is compared to addiction, and drug addicts also exhibit obsessive thoughts about drug use. Tennov conceived of limerent fantasy (based in reality) as "intricate strategy planning". In the late 1990s, it was also speculated that falling in love lowered serotonin levels in the brain, believed to cause intrusive thoughts. This was based on a comparison to obsessive–compulsive disorder, but the experiments were ambiguous. The experiments also measured blood levels rather than in the central nervous system, making the results difficult to interpret. The first experiment found that serotonin transporter levels were lower, but a second experiment found that blood serotonin levels in men and women were affected differently. This second experiment found that obsessive thinking was actually associated with increased serotonin in women. SSRI use also seemed to not have an effect on obsessive thinking in a 2025 study.

For some people who fear intimacy or have a history of trauma, limerent fantasy might be an escape, without the threat of real intimacy.

=== Crystallization ===
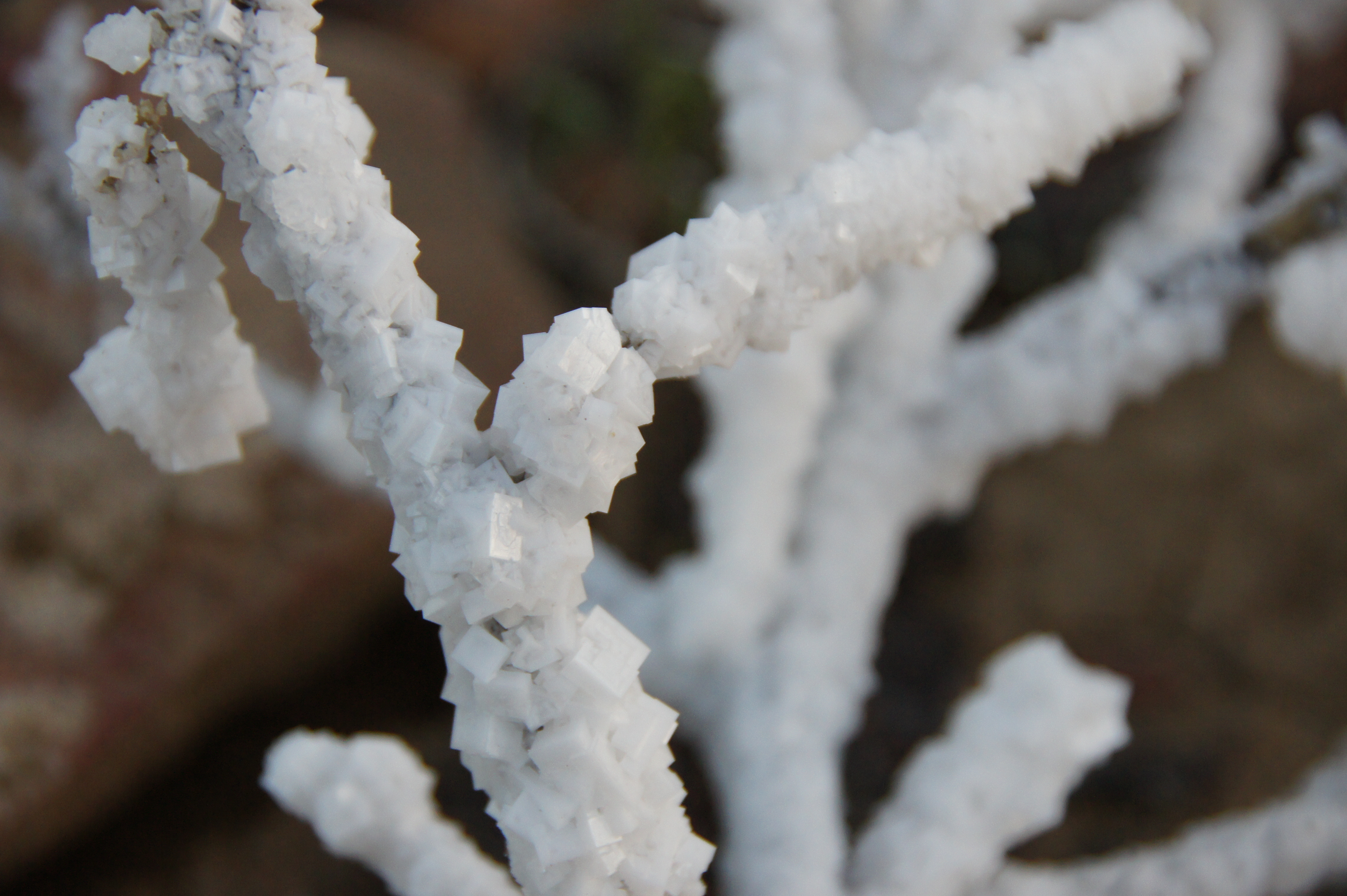

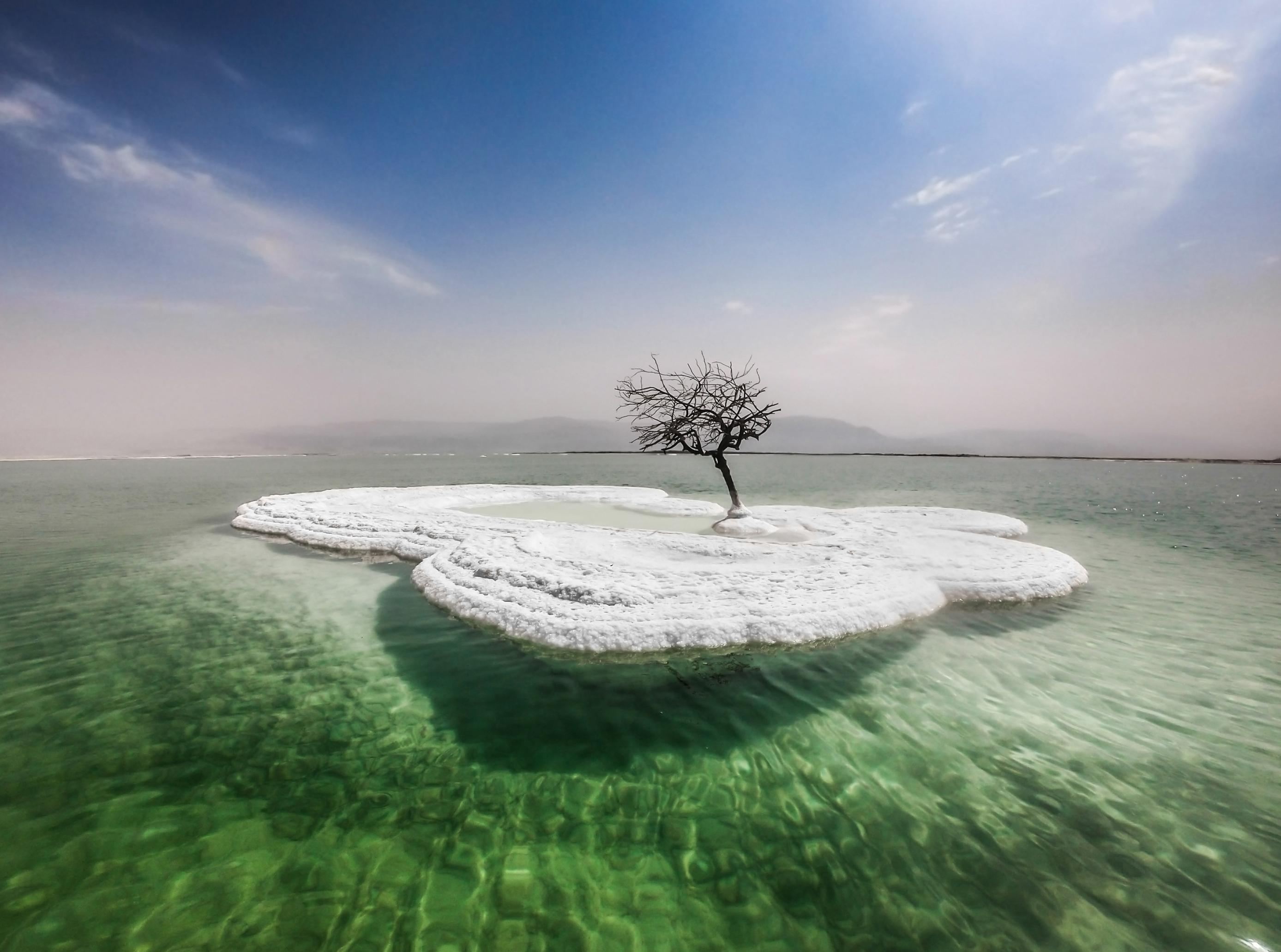
Crystallized salt

Crystallization, for Tennov, is the "remarkable ability to emphasize what is truly admirable in LO and to avoid dwelling on the negative, even to respond with a compassion for the negative and render it, emotionally if not perceptually, into another positive attribute." The term comes from the French writer Stendhal's 1821 treatise on love, De l'Amour, in which he describes an analogy where a tree branch is tossed into a salt mine. After several months, the tree branch (or twig) becomes covered in salt crystals which transform it "into an object of shimmering beauty". In the same way, unattractive characteristics of an LO are given little to no attention, so that the LO is seen in the most favorable light. One of Tennov's informants says:

Yes I knew he gambled, I knew he sometimes drank too much, and I knew he didn't read a book from one year to the next. I knew and I didn't know. [...] I dwelt on his wavy hair, the way he looked at me, the thought of his driving to work in the morning, his charm (that I believed must surely affect everyone he met), the flowers he sent, [...]. Okay! I know it's crazy, that my list of 'positives' sounds silly, but those are the things I think of, remember, and, yes, want back again!

This kind of "misperception" or "love is blind" cognitive bias is more often referred to as "idealization", which modern research considers to be a form of positive illusions. Past authors have sometimes depicted idealization as a malady, but significant scientific evidence has shown that positive illusions actually contribute to relationship satisfaction, long-term well-being and decreased risk for relationship discontinuation. Tennov argues against the term "idealization", because she says it implies that the image seen by the person experiencing romantic passion "is molded to fit a preformed, externally derived, or emotionally needed conception". In crystallization, the term she prefers, "the actual and existing features of LO merely undergo enhancement."

A limerent person may overlook red flags or incompatibilities. Crystallization can be an impediment to recovery, as one of Tennov's informants relates:

I decided to make a list in block letters of everything about Elsie that I found unpleasant or annoying. It was a very long list. On the other side of the paper, I listed her good points. It was a short list. But it didn't help at all. The good points seemed so much more important, and the bad things, well, in Elsie they weren't so bad, or they were things I felt I could help her with.

=== Readiness ===
Some people have a heightened susceptibility to limerence, a state Tennov calls "readiness", "longing for limerence" or being "in love with love". This can occur due to biological factors (like adolescence), but also psychological factors (like loneliness or discontent). Sometimes readiness can be so intense that a person falls in love with somebody with only minimal appeal.

Readiness was originally emphasized as an antecedent to falling in love by the psychoanalyst Theodor Reik. Reik (and Freud before him) believed that unhappy people tend to be the most vulnerable to love and fantasy; Elaine Hatfield concurs, saying "the greater our need, the more grandiose our fantasies". When one is most dissatisfied, their idealization is said to become an entire fantasy structure mixed up with reality, draped around the loved one; hence, according to clinical theories, romantic love tends to actually grow from one's unfulfilled needs, deficiencies, or dissatisfaction with oneself. Abraham Maslow called such love "deficiency-love", for the same reason, and contrasted it with "being-love": what one ought to aspire to in his view, but few experience. These clinical theorists have been interpreted as dealing with the same ("hot, passionate") aspects of love as Tennov, though they were writing before her.

Shaver & Hazan observed that lonely people are more susceptible to limerence, arguing that if people have many unmet social needs and are unaware, then a sign somebody is interested in them may become magnified into something quite unrealistic.

=== Uncertainty and hope ===
According to Dorothy Tennov, as an elaboration on a theory by Stendhal, "uncertainty" is a key element to limerence:

The recognition that some uncertainty must exist has been commented on and complained about by virtually everyone who has undertaken a serious study of the phenomenon of romantic love. Psychologists Ellen Berscheid and Elaine Walster discussed this common observation made, they note, by Socrates, Ovid, the Kama Sutra, and "Dear Abby," that the presentation of a hard-to-get as opposed to an immediately yielding exterior is a help in eliciting passion.

Rather than being an emotion itself, romantic love is a motivational state which elicits different emotions depending on the situation: positive feelings when things go well and negative feelings when things go awry. The "goal" according to Tennov's analysis is "oneness" with the LO, i.e. mutual reciprocation or return of feelings; a person in limerence is emotionally dependent on the perceived probability of this reciprocation. In the reward theory of attraction, an LO is seen as a reinforcer because of the potential for a rewarding experience in their presence.

According to Tennov's theory, two elements are required for limerence to develop and intensify: hope and uncertainty. There must be at least some hope that an LO will reciprocate, but uncertainty over their true feelings is required for the preoccupation and mood changes to intensify. In some cases, uncertain reciprocation can produce mood swings which are so abrupt as to cause emotional volatility, even in generally stable people. One of Tennov's informants recalls: "When I felt [Barry] loved me, I was intensely in love and deliriously happy; when he seemed rejecting, I was still intensely in love, only miserable beyond words."

Limerence normally subsides when either:

1. all hope of reciprocation is ended;
2. the limerent person enters a relationship with the LO and receives adequate reciprocation;
3. limerence is "transferred" to a different LO.

In even some further cases ("and this is the madness of it", Tennov says), the lovesickness and intrusive thoughts can still remain, even after all hope is exhausted and the sufferer wants to be rid of the state. After a transition to addiction, the executive brain is sidestepped, and some reactions and behavioral habits become essentially automatic.

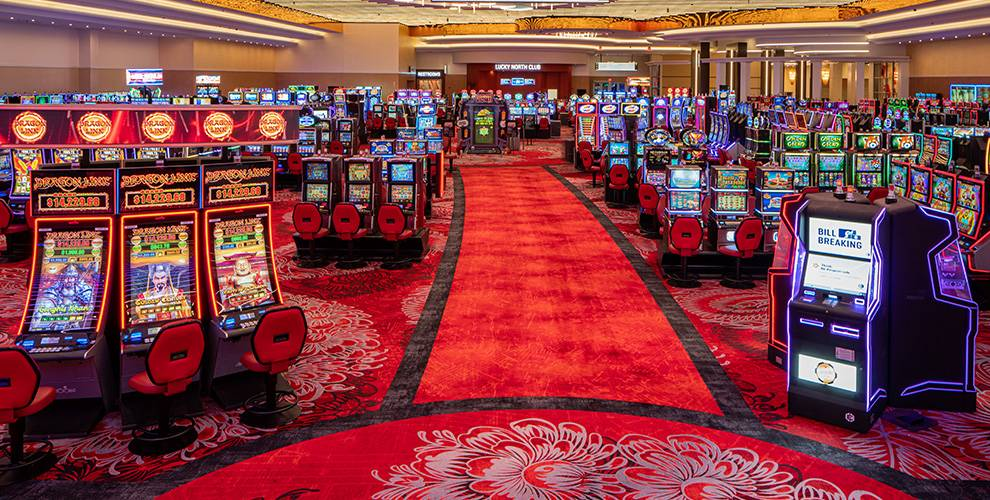
"Both gamblers and limerents find reason to hope in wild dreams." —Dorothy Tennov

The uncertainty of limerence has been interpreted as intermittent reinforcement by Robert Sternberg, keeping the brain "hooked" in. When people behave inconsistently or contrary to expectations, this can spark interest and be a fuel for passion (either ecstasy or agony). This relies on a mechanic of dopamine, which does not encode reward per se, but rather encodes a "reward prediction error" signal: whether a given reward is better than, equal to, or worse than expected. A slot machine involves a comparable situation, where the rewards are designed to be always unpredictable so the gambler cannot understand the pattern. Unable to habituate to the experience, for some people the exhilarating high from the unexpected wins leads to gambling addiction and compulsions. If the machine paid out on a regular interval (so that the rewards were expected), it would not be as exciting. The uncertainty of receiving an occasional message from an LO is "gasoline poured on the fire", according to Judson Brewer.

Uncertainty can also be introduced by the presence of barriers to a relationship, like parental interference or a deceived spouse. This "intensification through adversity" was crucial to the mutual limerence of Romeo and Juliet, hence this is often called "the Romeo and Juliet effect". Helen Fisher called it "frustration attraction", and believed that separation evokes panic and stress, which activates the hypothalamic–pituitary–adrenal axis. It's ironic, she says, because this can also produce dopamine, so "as the adored one slips away, the very chemicals that contribute to feelings of romance grow even more potent". According to Tennov, "It is limerence, not love, that increases when lovers are able to meet only infrequently or when there is anger between them."

One can attempt to extinguish limerence by removing any hope that an LO will reciprocate. An individual who is the object of unwanted limerent attraction should give the clearest possible rejection, rather than ambiguities such as "I like you as a friend, but...".

=== Ecstatic union ===
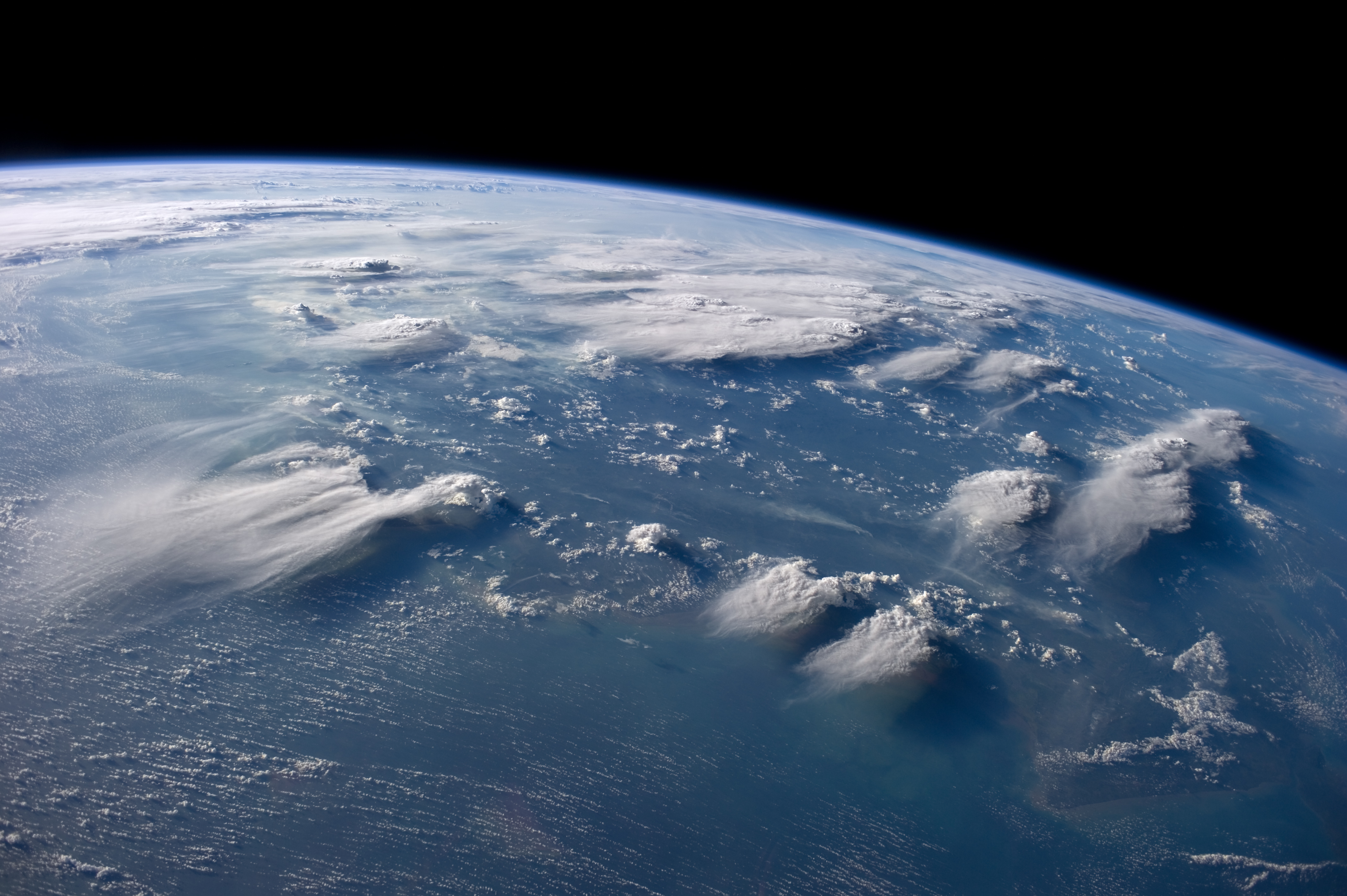
"I felt as though the clouds were not on the horizon but under my feet. How sweet it was." —Liv Ullmann

Although limerence is usually unrequited, it can lead to a relationship in some cases. According to Tennov's theory and observations, small doses of attention from an LO (along with uncertainty) increase the intensity of limerence, and a sensation of buoyancy or "walking on air" is felt when reciprocation seems near. "Reciprocation leads to euphoria, followed by a union that might be stable or unstable, and that might or might not endure." This "ecstatic union" (a phrase coined by Simone de Beauvoir) is recalled by one of Tennov's informants: "The landlord had given me notice and the bank loan had not gone through, and I could not bring myself to care! Whatever happened, it would be wonderful somehow. My delight in simply existing eclipsed everything else". 95% of her survey group called love "a beautiful experience".

A 2025 study of the largest cross-cultural survey of currently in-love people (who were also in relationships) categorized 29.42% of their sample as "intense" romantic lovers, and 28.57% of those fell in love before their relationship. (That is, only 8.4% of the study were both intensely in love and also fell in love before their relationship. The majority of intense lovers fell in love after their relationship started, with one month after being the average.)

Normally then, limerence diminishes inside a relationship, with reciprocity. Desire fades because of a habituation effect on dopamine activity: as a reward is more easily and predictably obtained, the dopamine release in response to reward cues decreases. Research also suggests that oxytocin activity might inhibit the more excessive effects of addiction, with oxytocin from the attachment system being more active in reciprocated, well-functioning relationships compared to unrequited situations. In some cases, however, just getting into a relationship by itself may still not be enough for limerence to diminish, if reciprocation is insufficient. According to Tennov, reciprocation must be "sustained and believable", else limerence can continue inside a relationship if the partner (LO) behaves in a nonlimerent way. Limerence and uncertainty theory have also been interpreted in terms of attachment anxiety, worsening the symptoms. This can be caused both by an anxious attachment style or a situation where (for example) an avoidant partner can make a normally secure person feel and act anxious (as in the person–situation debate). One man interviewed by Tennov described being caught in one-sided limerence with his wife "in constant fear of divorce" for 25 years (until she died); later, however, he found a different partner whom he did not have this reaction to. Under the attachment view, passion wanes as a relationship becomes more secure (as uncertainty is reduced).

The Passionate Love Scale obsession factor (compared to limerence) has been correlated with relationship satisfaction in short-term relationships; however, studies have also found that as romantic obsession continues inside a relationship over a longer time, the correlation is with decreased satisfaction. This is speculated to be due to low self-esteem and insecure or anxious attachment. Other studies have found that anxious attachment mediated the relationship between neuroticism and its related love styles, and the mania love attitude (which has been related to limerence) mediated the relationship between neuroticism and relationship satisfaction.

In some cases, limerence can be extinguished quite quickly after a relationship is established, because with more routine contact the participants begin to notice things they do not like about each other. A reminiscent concept from triangular theory of love is "fatuous love" (passion, with commitment, without intimacy): as in new passionate lovers who commit to marry without really knowing each other. Usually this fatuous passion fades and turns into just an unhappy commitment by itself, called "empty love". The philosopher Bertrand Russell is quoted by Tennov in her discussion of uncertainty, quipping that "when a man has no difficulty in obtaining a woman, his feeling towards her does not take the form of romantic love", but Russell goes on to say that "I think it is good—that romantic love should form the motive for a marriage, but it should be understood that the kind of love which will enable a marriage to remain happy and to fulfil its social purpose is not romantic but is something more intimate, affectionate, and realistic. In romantic love the beloved object is not seen accurately, but through a glamorous mist".

According to Tennov, ideally limerence will be replaced by another type of love. In this way, feelings may evolve: "Those whose limerence was replaced by affectional bonding with the same partner might say, 'We were very much in love when we married; today we love each other very much.'" The more stable type of love which is usually the characteristic of long-term relationships is commonly called companionate love, storge or attachment. An fMRI experiment of people who were in happy, long-term relationships (10 years or more) but professed to still be "madly" in love found brain activations in dopamine-rich reward areas (interpreted as "wanting" or "desire for union"), but also activity in the globus palludus, a site for opiate receptors identified as a hedonic hotspot ("liking"). Unlike people who were newly in love, these participants also did not show activity in areas associated with anxiety and fear, and reported far less obsessional features.

=== Duration ===
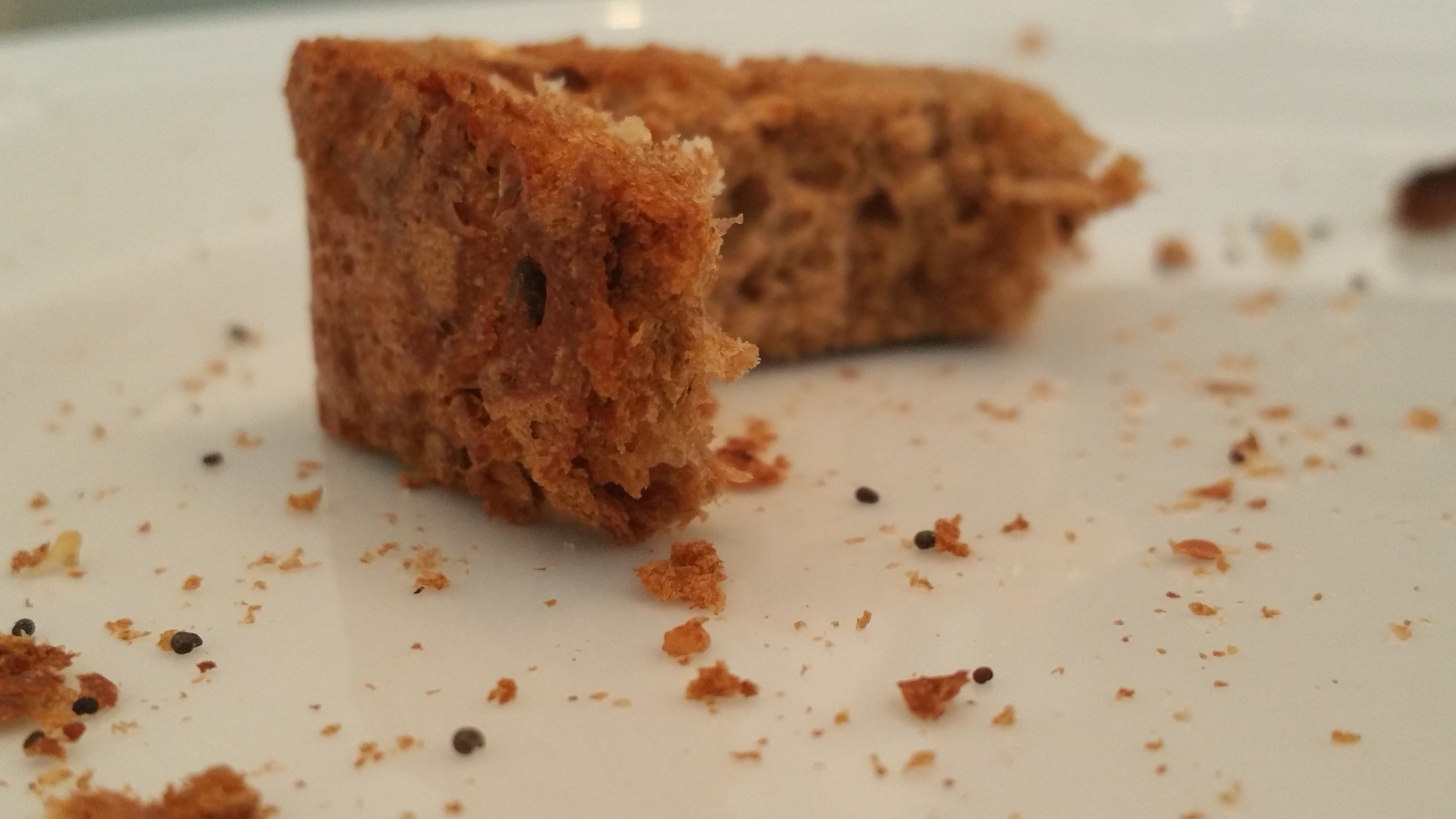
"Limerence can live a long life sustained by crumbs." —Dorothy Tennov

Tennov estimates based on her questionnaire and interviews that limerence most frequently lasts between 18 months and 3 years, with an average of 2 years, but may be as short as mere days or as long as a lifetime. One woman wrote to Tennov about her mother's limerence which lasted 65 years.

Limerence can last indefinitely sometimes when unrequited, especially when reciprocation is uncertain: with intermittent reinforcement and mixed signals, for example, an LO ignoring the limerent person for a while and then suddenly calling. Tennov calls it the worst case when the limerent person cannot get away, because the LO is a coworker or lives nearby. Stringing a limerent person along with intermittent communication is called "breadcrumbing".

Tennov's estimate (18–36 months) has been used as a normal duration of romantic love; however, a scientific study found the normal duration of romantic love (that is, the "falling in love" or "being in love" stage) inside relationships may be even shorter than Tennov estimated. This study tested subjects who were "truly, deeply and madly in love" in relationships, measuring blood plasma levels of nerve growth factor (NGF), which was found to be elevated and associated with increased Passionate Love Scale scores. After 12–24 months, subjects were retested and NGF levels were back to normal. Based on this study, it was also reported in the BBC that romantic love "lasts just about a year".

Romantic relationships are also believed to depend on uncertainty which is perpetuated, for example, by confusing and tumultuous on-again-off-again relationships—probably the most likely to sustain infatuation (but not security).

A study on unrequited love sought to build on Tennov's research, with a focus on the obsessive experience. This study found the mean duration of unrequited love was between 3–6 months, using a definition of "having one's emotions on a roller coaster, finding it difficult to concentrate, and thinking constantly about the person with whom you are in love. The person is said to have the power to produce extreme highs and lows of emotion in you, depending on how he or she acts towards you." A different study found that several types of unrequited love relationships lasted on average 10–17 months.

== Love regulation ==
Love regulation, studied by the psychologist Sandra Langeslag, is "the use of behavioral or cognitive strategies to change the intensity of current feelings of romantic love". Langeslag works with Helen Fisher's model (lust, attraction and attachment, i.e. independent emotion systems), but uses the terms infatuation (i.e. passionate love) and attachment (i.e. companionate love). Contrary to the common misconception that love feelings cannot or should not be controlled, studies using EEG and psychometrics have shown that love regulation is possible and can be useful.

In a technique called cognitive reappraisal, one focuses on positive or negative aspects of their beloved, the relationship, or imagined future scenarios:

- In positive reappraisal, one focuses on positive qualities of the beloved ("he's kind", "she's spontaneous"), the relationship ("we have so much fun together") or imagined future scenarios ("we'll live happily ever after"). Positive reappraisal increases attachment and can increase relationship satisfaction.
- In negative reappraisal, one focuses on negative qualities of the beloved ("he's lazy", "she's always late"), the relationship ("we fight a lot") or imagined future scenarios ("he'll cheat on me"). Negative reappraisal decreases feelings of infatuation and attachment, but decreases mood in the short term. Langeslag has recommended distraction as an antidote to the short-term decrease in mood.

Preliminary results from a 2024 study of online limerence communities conducted by Langeslag found that negative reappraisal decreased limerence for the study participants. A therapist named Brandy Wyant has also had her limerent clients list reasons their LO is not perfect, or reasons they and their LO are not compatible. Love regulation doesn't switch feelings on or off immediately, so Langeslag recommends writing a list of things once a day as an example.

The neuroscientist Tom Bellamy recommends what he calls the "daymare" strategy: if a person in limerence finds themselves lost in a romantic daydream, they should "spoil the rewards" by changing the end of the story into a nightmare. Ruining reward-seeking habits like this is recommended as a kind of "deprogramming" to "accelerate the overwriting of memories linking LO to reward".

Based on the addiction theory of romantic love, Helen Fisher and colleagues recommend that rejected lovers remove all reminders of their beloved, such as letters or photos, and avoid contact with the rejecting partner. Reminders can cause cravings which prolong recovery. They also suggest that positive contact with friends could reduce cravings. Rejected lovers should stay busy to distract themselves, and engage in self-expanding activities. Setting a "no contact" rule during recovery can facilitate self-care and time to reflect on the situation.

However, if limerence is being sustained by a fantasy (making the reward more potent), then getting to know the person for real can also be the fastest way to get over them.

== Contentions ==
In 2008, Albert Wakin, a professor who knew Tennov at the University of Bridgeport but did not assist in her research, and Duyen Vo, a graduate student, suggested that limerence is similar to obsessive–compulsive disorder (OCD) and substance use disorder (SUD). They presented work to an American Association of Behavioral and Social Sciences conference, but suggested that much more research is needed before it could be proposed to the APA that limerence be included in the DSM. They began conducting an unpublished study and reported to USA Today that about 25% or 30% of their participants had experienced a limerent relationship as they defined it. Wakin has stated that his concept involves people in relationships, where a person is obsessed with their partner to the detriment of the relationship, even to the point of a breakup.

The concepts of limerence, romantic love, passionate love (and so on) have been compared to OCD since 1998, according to a theory invented by other authors. This was partly based on a theoretical comparison between preoccupation features, like worries about a family member being harmed and a need for things to be "just right". This is also sometimes paired with a theory involving the neurotransmitter serotonin, but experimental evidence for that is ambiguous. A 2025 study found no association between SSRI use and obsessive thinking about a loved one or the intensity of romantic love. Neuroscientist blogger Tom Bellamy has argued that limerence is distinct from OCD on the basis of psychological and neurobiological differences. OCD is characterized by compulsions to perform rituals that ease some type of fear, whereas limerence initially starts with a period of joy and only reaches a stage of anxiety when a pair bond cannot be formed.

Helen Fisher has commented on Wakin & Vo in 2008, stating that limerence is romantic love and that "They are associating the negative aspects of it with the term, and that can be a disorder." Fisher is one of the original authors to compare limerence to OCD, and has proposed that romantic love is a "natural addiction" which can be either positive or negative depending on the situation. Fisher stated again in 2024 that she does not think there is any difference between limerence and romantic love. Sandra Langeslag commented in 2026 that limerence is a form of passionate love or infatuation.

In 2017, Wakin has stated that he feels that brain scans of limerence would help establish it as "something unlike everything that has been diagnosed already", but brain scans have been described by Fisher's team since as far back as 2002. In Fisher et al.'s original brain scan experiments, all participants spent more than 85% of their waking hours thinking about their loved one. Wakin also claims that a person experiencing limerence can never be satiated, even if their feelings are reciprocated. Tennov found many cases of nonlimerent people who described their limerent partners being "stricken with a kind of insatiability", and that "no degree of attentiveness was ever sufficient". According to Tennov's theory, the intensity of limerence diminishes with reciprocity, and it's prolonged inside a relationship when the LO behaves in a nonlimerent way. Other mainstream authors have stated that obsession inside a relationship when it's a problem could be related to self-esteem and an insecure attachment style.

In the 1999 preface to her revised edition of Love and Limerence, Dorothy Tennov describes limerence as an aspect of basic human nature and remarks that "Reaction to limerence theory depends partly on acquaintance with the evidence for it and partly on personal experience. People who have not experienced limerence are baffled by descriptions of it and are often resistant to the evidence that it exists. To such outside observers, limerence seems pathological." Tennov states that her studies suggest limerence is normal, that it's too often interpreted as "mental illness", and that even those who experienced limerence of a distressing variety were "fully functioning, rational, emotionally stable, normal, nonneurotic, nonpathological members of society", "characterized as responsible and quite sane". Tragedies such as violence, she says, involve limerence when it's "augmented and distorted" by other conditions.

In a 2005 Q&A, Tennov was asked if limerence could ever lead to a situation like the movie Fatal Attraction (which has been called "obsessive love"), but Tennov replied that the movie seemed to depict a caricature. Limerence and stalking are separate phenomena with different causes. Most romantic stalkers are an ex-partner, erotomanic, have a personality disorder, are intellectually limited or socially incompetent. One writer who investigated the phenomenon of limerence videos on TikTok in 2024 wrote that it seemed to her that the many videos created by the relationship coaches there were actually about social media stalking rather than having anything at all to do with limerence.

== See also ==
- Biology of romantic love – Evolution and neuroscience of romantic love
- Broken heart – Intense stress or pain one feels at experiencing longing
- Crystallization (love) – Process of falling in love
- Eros (concept) – Ancient Greek word for being in love
- Erotomania – Romantic delusional disorder
- Infatuation – Intense, irrational attraction
- Love addiction – Proposed disorder of problematic passion & distress
- Lovesickness – Mental state of unfulfilled or unrequited love
- New relationship energy – State of mind during new relationship
- Obsessive love – Possessiveness and inability to accept rejection
- Passionate and companionate love – Two basic love feelings
- Puppy love – Feelings of romantic love felt by young people
- Relationship obsessive–compulsive disorder
- Romance – Love focused on feelings
- Romantic love (mental state) – Mental state of being in love
- Star-crossed – Pair of lovers thwarted by outside forces
- Unrequited love – Love that is not reciprocated
