= Crystallization (love) =

Process of falling in love

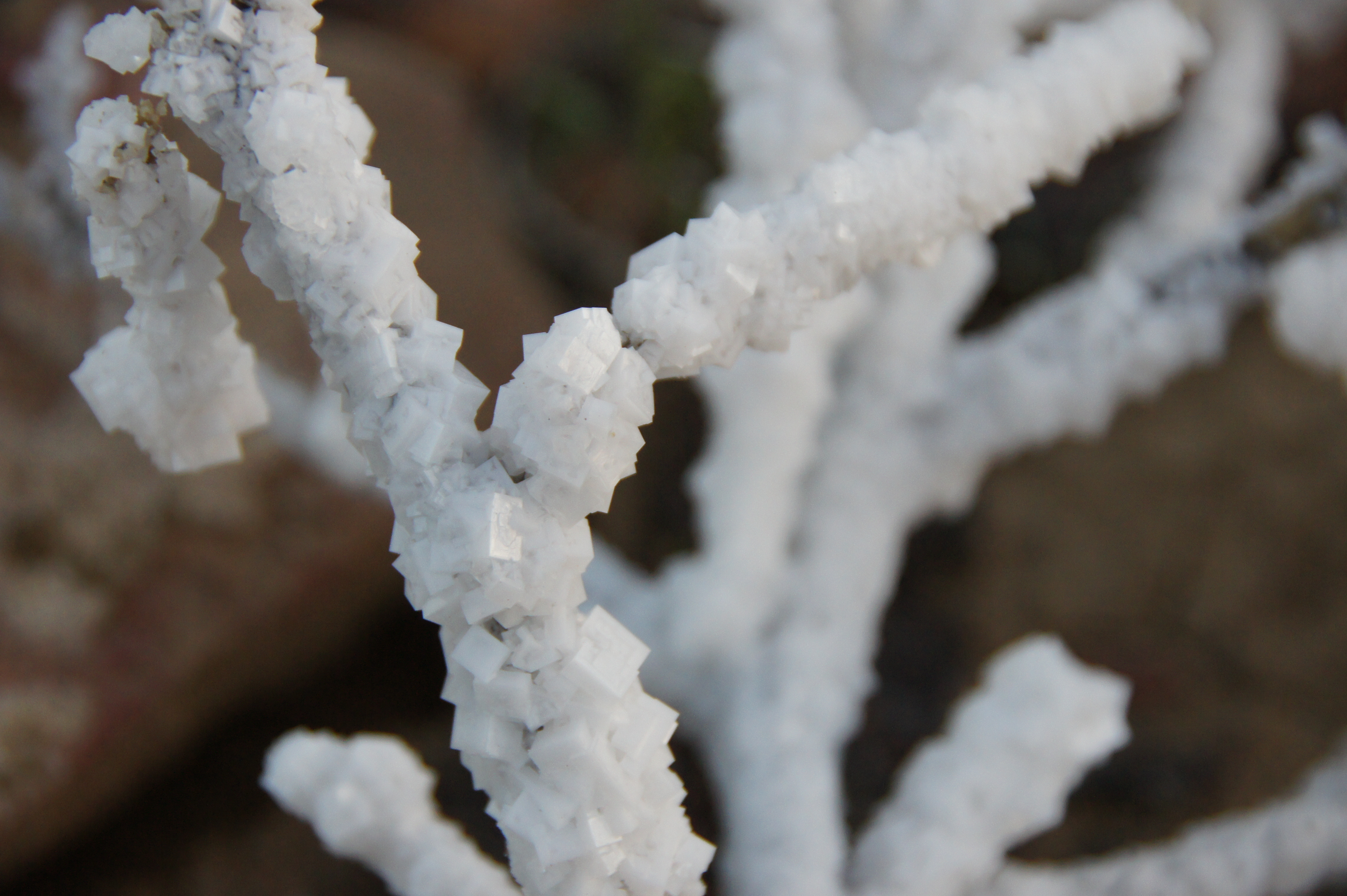

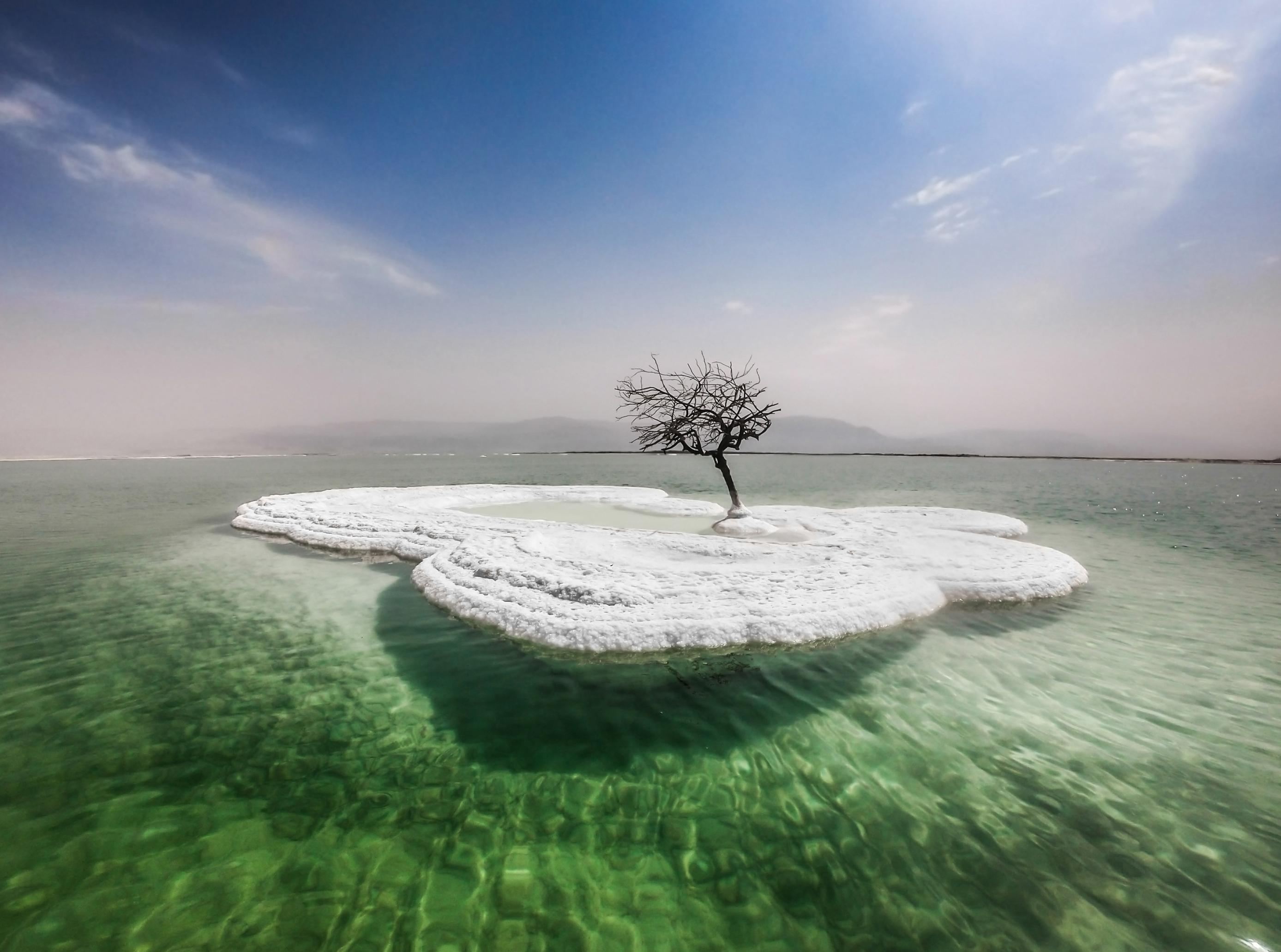
Crystallized salt

Crystallization is a concept, developed in 1822 by the French writer Stendhal, which describes the process, or mental metamorphosis, in which the characteristics of a new love are transformed into perceptual diamonds of shimmering beauty. According to a quotation by Stendhal: "What I call 'crystallization' is the operation of the mind that draws from all that presents itself the discovery that the loved object has some new perfections."

== Origin of term ==
In the summer of 1818 Stendhal took a trip to the salt mines of Hallein near Salzburg with his friend and associate Madame Gherardi. Here they discovered the phenomenon of salt crystallization and used it as a metaphor for human relationships.

In the salt mines, nearing the end of the winter season, the miners will throw a leafless wintry bough into one of the abandoned workings. Two or three months later, through the effects of the waters saturated with salt which soak the bough and then let it dry as they recede, the miners find it covered with a shining deposit of crystals. The tiniest twigs no bigger than a tom-tit's claw are encrusted with an infinity of little crystals scintillating and dazzling. The original little bough is no longer recognizable; it has become a child's plaything very pretty to see. When the sun is shining and the air is perfectly dry the miners of Hallein seize the opportunity of offering these diamond-studded boughs to travellers preparing to go down to the mine.

== Story behind term ==
During one particular trip into the 500-ft deep Salzburg mines, Stendhal and Madame Gherardi were introduced to an intelligent Bavarian officer who thereafter joined their company. Soon enough, the officer began to become quite taken by Madame Gherardi. The officer, according to Stendhal, could be seen to be visibly "falling in love" with her. What struck Stendhal the most, as an undertone of madness grew moment by moment in the discourse of the officer, was how the officer saw perfections in this woman that were more or less invisible to Stendhal's eyes. For example, the officer began to praise Madame Gherardi's hand, which had been marked by smallpox in her childhood and remained very pocked and rather brown.

Stendhal reasoned, "How shall I explain what I see?" He wondered, "Where shall I find a comparison to illustrate my thought?" Just at that moment Madame Gherardi was toying with a pretty branch covered with salt crystals that the miners had given her. The sun was shining and the salt prisms glittered like the finest diamonds in a brightly lit ballroom. From this observation Stendhal formulated his concept of mental "crystallization" and thus set forth to explain it to Madame Gherardi, who was curiously unaware of the officer's infatuation with her.

He told her, "The effect produced on this young man by the nobility of your Italian features and those eyes of which he has never seen the like is precisely similar to the effect of crystallization upon that little branch of hornbeam you hold in your hand and which you think so pretty. Stripped of its leaves by the winter it was certainly anything but dazzling until the crystallization of the salt covered its black twigs with such a multitude of shining diamonds that only here and there can one still see the twigs as they really are." That is, "This branch is a faithful representation of la Ghita (Madame Gherardi) as viewed by the imagination of this young officer."

Thus, according to Stendhal, the moment one begins to take interest in a person, one no longer sees him or her as they really are, but as it suits one to see them. According to this metaphor, one sees flattering illusions created by a nascent interest; illusions analogous to pretty diamonds hiding a leafless branch of hornbeam, perceived only by the eyes of the one falling in love.

== Process of crystallization ==
Stendhal describes the “birth of love” in a new relationship as being a process similar or analogous to a trip to Rome. In the analogy the city of Bologna represents indifference and Rome represents perfect love:

"When we are in Bologna, we are entirely indifferent; we are not concerned to admire in any particular way the person with whom we shall perhaps one day be madly in love with; even less is our imagination inclined to overrate their worth." In other words, in Bologna, “crystallization” has not yet begun. When the journey begins, love departs. One leaves Bologna, climbs the Apennines, and takes the road to Rome. The departure, according to Stendhal, has nothing to do with one's will; it is an instinctive moment. This transformative process is described in terms of four steps along a journey:

1. Admiration – one marvels at the qualities of the loved one.
2. Acknowledgement – one acknowledges the pleasantness of having gained the loved one's interest.
3. Hope – one envisions gaining the love of the loved one.
4. Delight – one delights in overrating the beauty and merit of the person whose love one hopes to win.

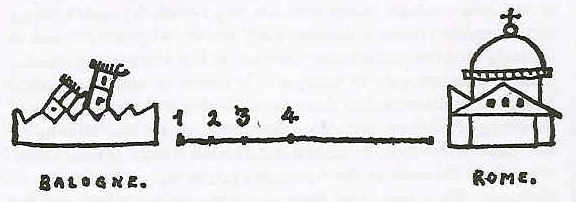
Stendhal's depiction of "crystallization" in the process of falling in love

This journey or crystallization process, shown above, was detailed by Stendhal on the back of a playing card while speaking to Madame Gherardi during his trip to the Salzburg salt mine.

== Applications ==
Psychologist Dorothy Tennov describes the process as a transformation in which the loved one's characteristics are crystallized via mental events and neurological reconfigurations such that attractive characteristics are exaggerated and unattractive characteristics are given little or no attention. She uses this basis for her description of a "limerent object", related to the concept of limerence.
