= Nelson Cruikshank =

Nelson Hale Cruikshank (June 21, 1902 – June 19, 1986) was known nationally in the United States as an expert on Social Security, Medicare and policy on aging. He was a Methodist minister, labor union activist and the first director of the Department of Social Security at the AFL–CIO before entering government service in his mid-60s.

Cruikshank is considered the most important non-legislator responsible for the enactment of Social Security Disability Insurance in 1956, which for the first time provided Social Security benefits to people with disabilities, and of Medicare in 1965. Later, as President Jimmy Carter's adviser and counselor on the aged and as chairman of the Federal Council on Aging, Cruikshank led successful efforts to preserve and expand Social Security benefits for the elderly and people with disabilities.

== Early life and career ==
Cruikshank was born in Bradner, Ohio in 1902 to Jesse and Jessie (Wright) Cruikshank. His father was a grain dealer who modeled fair business practices and taught the young Cruikshank to respect the value of the labor of the farmers and workers with whom the family did business. The family eventually moved to Texas. Cruikshank worked as a deck hand on freighters on the Great Lakes and was a member of the Seafarers Union before attending Oberlin College. He transferred to Ohio Wesleyan University, where he graduated with a bachelor's degree in economics and theology.

He married Florence Crane on August 30, 1928. Whom he met at a series of lectures on Christian socialism that he organized as a student pastor. They had one child, Alice, who went on to become a labor historian.

A devout Methodist, Cruikshank entered Union Theological Seminary in 1926 and obtained a Master of Divinity degree in 1929. During his time at Union Theological Seminary, Cruikshank became acquainted with the liberal theologian Reinhold Niebuhr. Niebuhr's teachings about the social gospel as well as his deep involvement in the labor union movement (he was an outspoken critic of Henry Ford and allowed union organizers to speak from his pulpit on union issues) were highly influential in forming Cruikshank's personal beliefs and life.

Cruikshank was later transferred to a Methodist church in New Haven, Connecticut, where he continued his social work. Cruikshank worked closely with local labor unions, eventually splitting his time between pastoral work and union organizing. He became close friends with Frank Fenton, who later became the director of organizing for the American Federation of Labor (AFL). Working with the Connecticut AFL–CIO, he organized unions at a number of local businesses—even serving briefly as the business agent for a local of the UE at the Whitney Blake Company. He also became tangentially involved in the Workers' Education Bureau of America. But Cruikshank was dissatisfied with pastoral work. He saw his career as a pastor taking him away from felt that people's needs were so great that in 1936, Cruikshank moved to Washington, D.C. and took a series of government jobs. He first worked for the Farm Security Administration (FSA) as a labor relations officer. He later transferred to the FSA's Migratory Farm Labor Program, where he worked to establish several hundred camps for farm workers migrating out of the Dust Bowl—a program later made famous in John Steinbeck's novel The Grapes of Wrath.

== AFL–CIO career ==
Cruikshank was appointed to the National Advisory Council on Social Security Financing in 1947, where he became the AFL's point-man on old age and health issues. He earned a national reputation as labor's persuasive spokesman on these issues. He lobbied strenuously for national health care, repeatedly taking on its principal opponent, the American Medical Association (AMA), in the print media and on widely aired radio debates.

=== Role in enactment of Social Security Disability Insurance ===
Cruikshank returned to the AFL in 1953. He performed various duties for Meany, who was then running what would become the AFL–CIO behind the scenes as president William Green's health declined. In 1955 Cruikshank was named director of the AFL's newly formed Department of Social Security. He continued in that role after the AFL and Congress of Industrial Organizations (CIO) merged in 1955. Cruikshank used his position to protect and enhance Social Security as part of the union movement's commitment to a comprehensive legislative package of federal social insurance programs, including national health care insurance and income supports for the poor, people with disabilities and the unemployed. He created the AFL–CIO's Social Security Advisory Committee as a political group to press for higher and expanded benefits. In 1956, Cruikshank's efforts were instrumental in winning passage of the Social Security Disability Insurance amendments, which provided income assistance to permanently disabled workers.

=== Role in enactment of Medicare ===
From 1961 to 1965, Cruikshank worked closely with NCSC. In April 1963, the group won a presidential proclamation establishing "Senior Citizen's Month" (now Older Americans Month). But his most important accomplishment was working behind the scenes to win passage of Medicare—national health insurance for the elderly. Cruikshank played a critical role in coordinating the lobbying efforts of NCSC, the AFL–CIO and other groups, and helped engineer a nationally televised speech by President John F. Kennedy at Madison Square Garden on May 20, 1962.

Cruikshank was a critical lobbyist for passage of Medicare. He helped eliminate any role for insurance companies as underwriters of national insurance. Medicare had been bottled up in committee for years, never having enough votes to be reported out onto either chamber's floor. After the 1964 presidential election, President Lyndon B. Johnson demanded that Rep. Wilbur Mills (D-Arkansas), chairman of the powerful House Ways and Means Committee, enlarge his committee and stack it with members who would approve Medicare. Mills co-opted the AMA and grafted Medicaid onto the bill, which then easily passed the House.

But in the Senate, Cruikshank had to work quickly to avoid disaster. Sen. Russell B. Long (D-Louisiana) offered an amendment in the Senate Finance Committee that would have turned Medicare into a catastrophic health insurance plan, rather than a general insurance program. Long misused a proxy vote from Sen. J. William Fulbright (D-Arkansas) to help win passage of the amendment, and misled Sen. Paul Douglas (D-Illinois) that he could vote to approve the amendment because another vote would be held later after costs had been calculated (a vote Long had no intention of seeking). Knowing that the Long amendment would not pass the House nor be backed by the AFL–CIO, Cruikshank convinced Douglas to exercise his parliamentary rights and ask for reconsideration of the Long amendment.

== Later career ==
Cruikshank did not leave the labor movement entirely, however. The year that he retired from the AFL–CIO, he became executive director of the NCSC, the AFL–CIO's retiree organization affiliate and forerunner of the Alliance for Retired Americans. In 1969, he was elected president of NCSC following Aime Forand's retirement.

In 1980, Cruikshank left the Carter administration to head up an education and research effort with the organization Save Our Security (SOS). SOS was established in 1979 by Wilbur Cohen, one of the original drafters of the Social Security Act. SOS was a coalition of more than 200 organizations — primarily labor unions and advocacy groups for the disabled and the aged — formed in response to efforts to weaken Social Security. Later, SOS proposed expanding Social Security disability payments and Medicare benefits, and fought to secure benefits for so-called "notch" beneficiaries. Cruikshank directed the Nelson Cruikshank Social Insurance Study Project for SOS. The project developed curricula and educational materials for elementary, secondary and post-secondary students to increase awareness of social insurance.
