= Howard S. Hoffman =

- Born: May 23, 1925; New York City, New York
- Died: August 31, 2006 (aged 81); Haverford, Pennsylvania
- Citizenship: American
- Education: New School for Social Research (B.A. 1952), Brooklyn College (M.A. 1953), University of Connecticut (Ph.D 1957)
- Known for: Imprinting, startle reflex, memory
- Spouse(s): Dorothy Tennov, Alice M. Hoffman
- Children: 6
- Scientific career
- Fields: Experimental psychology
- Workplaces: University of Connecticut, Pennsylvania State University (1957–1970), Bryn Mawr College (1970–1991)

Howard S. Hoffman (May 23, 1925 – August 31, 2006) was an American experimental psychologist.

Hoffman's work on imprinting, the startle reflex, and memory were particularly influential and earned him an international reputation. He published hundreds of papers as well as a book about the experience of being a scientist, Amorous Turkeys and Addicted Ducklings: A Search for the Causes of Social Attachment.

== Career ==
Hoffman received grants from the National Science Foundation, National Institutes of Health and the National Institute for Mental Health. He served as chairman of a National Institute of Mental Health committee to review grant applications.

Hoffman was a veteran of World War II who served in the European theatre. He earned five bronze stars and two invasion arrowheads. Following the war, he initially studied physics at the University of Chicago, but was uncertain which of his divergent interests he should pursue. Supported by the Veterans Administration, which identified his aptitude for physics, mathematics, and painting, Hoffman later attended art school, studying under Moses Sawyer. After observing children in the nursery school where he was employed, he turned to psychology (not, ironically, one of the domains identified by the VA's aptitude testing) and ultimately earned his Ph.D. Hoffman continued to paint. He had one-man shows at Bryn Mawr and the Tyme Gallery, and his work joined the permanent collections of Bryn Mawr, Haverford College, Rosemont College, and the University of Pennsylvania.

Hoffman taught statistics at the University of Connecticut, where he earned his Ph.D, then moved to the psychology department of Pennsylvania State University in 1957. Hoffman is credited with rediscovering prepulse inhibition in 1963, and inventing the term. His many papers on the reflex and its modification laid the groundwork for the widespread use of prepulse inhibition today in studies of schizophrenia and other disorders. In 1970, Hoffman joined the faculty of Bryn Mawr College. While there, he taught courses on perception and statistics. The perception classes spurred his development of techniques to teach drawing and lead to the book Vision and the Art of Drawing.

== Personal life ==
Hoffman had three sons with his first wife, the psychologist Dorothy Tennov. His second wife, the historian Alice M. Hoffman, had two children from a previous marriage, then they had another daughter together, raising a total of six children. Hoffman collaborated with his son, Russell, to create a computerized statistics course. In collaboration with Alice Hoffman he wrote Archives of Memory: A Soldier Recalls World War II and The Cruikshank Chronicles: Anecdotes, Stories, and Memoirs of a New Deal Liberal.
