= Alice M. Hoffman (historian) =

American labor and oral historian

Alice M. Hoffman is an American labor and oral historian.

== Career ==
Alice M. Hoffman was an associate professor of labor history at Penn State, where she founded the Labor Archives and Oral History Project. After retiring, she taught oral history methodology at Bryn Mawr College. She was the principal consultant for the Bicentennial Labor History Exhibit for the Philadelphia Council of the AFL-CIO. She was Assistant to the Deputy Secretary for Labor and Industry for the State of Pennsylvania.

From 1974 to 1976, Hoffman served as vice-president and president of the Oral History Association. She is president emerita of the Pennsylvania Labor History Society. Hoffman received the Oral History in the Mid-Atlantic Region's 1985 Forrest Pogue Award for excellence in oral history.

Archives of Memory: A Soldier Recalls World War II (1990) was co-authored with Hoffman's husband, a psychologist, war veteran, and interview subject. The book provided a model for the utility of interviews and memorial evidence in historical investigations. The Hoffmans also co-edited The Cruikshank Chronicles: Anecdotes, Stories, and Memoirs of a New Deal Liberal, with a foreword by Jimmy and Rosalynn Carter.

== Personal life ==
Hoffman is the daughter of labor activist Nelson Cruikshank and his wife Florence Crane. She married experimental psychologist Howard S. Hoffman, with whom she raised six children.
