= Alliance for Retired Americans =

Senior citizen organization

- Alliance for Retired Americans
- Abbreviation: ARA
- Founded: 2001
- Headquarters: Washington, D.C.
- Location: United States
- Members: 4 million+
- Key people: Robert Roach, Jr., president
- Affiliations: AFL-CIO
- Website: www.retiredamericans.org

The Alliance for Retired Americans (ARA) is a 501(c)(4) non-profit organization and nonpartisan organization of retired trade union members affiliated with the AFL-CIO, which founded it in 2001. The group's membership also includes non-union, community-based activists. Its predecessor organization was known as the National Council of Senior Citizens (NCSC).

As of 2020, the Alliance has 4.4 million members nationwide and has state programs in 39 states. It has 1,500 local chapters.

== Founding ==
The labor movement in the United States had promoted health insurance for the poor and indigent since the 1920s, but little legislative interest had been taken in the American Federation of Labor's proposals.

The political environment began to change in the late 1950s. The Eisenhower administration began to study the needs of the aged, and liberal Republicans began to support health insurance for the elderly. As President Eisenhower's administration drew to a close in 1960, planning began for the first White House Conference on Aging, to take place in 1961.

The by-now merged AFL-CIO held some influence in the Republican White House. Nelson Rockefeller, then an undersecretary in the United States Department of Health, Education, and Welfare, was planning a political career and wanted to be on good terms with George Meany, president of the AFL-CIO. It was Rockefeller who had primary responsibility for planning the upcoming conference. Meany, meanwhile, assigned Nelson Cruikshank, director of the AFL-CIO's Department of Social Security, to closely monitor Rockefeller. When it came time to appoint a chair for the conference, Cruikshank suggested Robert Kean, a liberal Republican congressman from New Jersey. Although Kean had not supported national health insurance previously, he had supported labor on several Social Security votes, had not opposed national health insurance, was open to new ideas, and sat on the powerful House Ways and Means Committee. If the White House Conference on Aging were to recommend national health insurance legislation, having Kean's imprimatur would be important. Kean was also not likely to use the power of his chairmanship against labor in the conference's hearings or votes on its final report.

Working with Rockefeller and his staff, the AFL-CIO then was able to get national health insurance assigned to the committee on income maintenance. The assignment was critical to the AFL-CIO's strategy for moving federal legislation forward, for the AFL-CIO had decided (as a matter of legislative strategy) that any bill should be offered as an amendment to the Social Security Act rather than as a stand-alone law. The American Medical Association (AMA), which vehemently opposed any national health scheme for the aged as "socialized medicine", was intent on stacking the Conference's committee on health with its representatives in order to block any health insurance discussion.

Meanwhile, events that occurred during the 1960 presidential election actually helped boost Cruikshank's chances at the Conference on Aging.

During the 1960 presidential election, the AFL-CIO worked to build a coalition in favor of national health insurance for the aged. As Senator John F. Kennedy stacked up primary wins, the AFL-CIO convinced the Kennedy team on August 12, 1960, to establish a 23-member group called "Senior Citizens-for-Kennedy." The goal of the group was ostensibly to help the candidate develop policy proposals on health care for the aged. Rep. Aime J. Forand (D-Rhode Island) was named chair of the group.

After Kennedy won the election, the AFL-CIO used the coalition built by Senior Citizens-for-Kennedy to push its agenda at the 1961 White House Conference on Aging. The AFL-CIO coordinated the work of these groups during the conference. It established a communications center, and mobilized witnesses and votes as needed. Whenever health insurance for the aged was brought up in any committee other than the Social Security committee, the proposal was voted down or declared out of order. When the Conference voted on its final report, the AMA was surprised to find a health insurance proposal part of the recommended legislative package. The AFL-CIO coalition had grown to more than 500 groups, and attempts by the AMA to strike the proposal from the report were easily defeated.

The success of the AFL-CIO coalition during the 1961 White House Conference on Aging led Forand to suggest that an organization be formed to push for similar legislation in the future. The American Association of Retired Persons (AARP), founded in 1958, did not have a substantial membership yet. The Democratic National Committee and AFL-CIO then worked together to transform the Kennedy group into the National Council of Senior Citizens (NCSC). The new organization was formally announced in July 1961. The United Auto Workers and United Steelworkers pushed their retirees to sign up as members, and both unions as well as the AFL-CIO contributed seed-money to finance the group. Forand, who had retired from office in 1960, became the NCSC's first president and William Hutton, a public relations official with the AFL-CIO, its first executive director.

== Critical role in enacting Medicare ==
In April 1963, President Kennedy met with leaders of NCSC. The meeting led the president to declare each May as "Senior Citizens Month" (now Older Americans Month). It was a sign of NCSC's growing influence.

NCSC was instrumental in passing Medicare. It backed a number of (admittedly abortive) legislative efforts, held rallies (including one gigantic, nationally televised event at Madison Square Garden, organized letter-writing campaigns, and attacked Medicare's opponents by bombarding them with mail and picketing their offices. The assassination of President Kennedy in November 1963 proved fortuitous for Medicare's legislative chances. President Lyndon B. Johnson considered old age health insurance to be a much higher priority than Kennedy did.

A shift in NCSC's strategy proved crucial in helping to build support for Medicare as well. NCSC began a major education campaign among middle-aged people, working to raise awareness of how burdensome hospital bills for the elderly could be. Medicare's passage in the US Senate was very close, and NCSC's efforts were considered instrumental in its enactment.

== Growth period and funding ==
By the early 1970s, NCSC had grown to more than 2,000 state and local affiliates across the United States.

During the 1960s and 1970s, NCSC funded its activities largely through the use of federal funds. In 1965, President Johnson signed the Older Americans Act. Title V of the act created Operation Mainstream, which funded part-time employment for under-employed people aged 55 or older. In 1967, Operation Mainstream was renamed the Senior Community Service Employment Program (SCSEP). The United States Department of Labor in 1968 chose NCSC as one of the organizations designated to operate SCSEP. NCSC called its program the Senior Alert, Industrious, Dedicated, Energetic Service ("Senior AIDES").

Although about 90 percent of NCSC's funds were spent on Senior AIDES, the organization stayed very active politically throughout the 1970s. NCSC was particularly active in lobbying for an anti-inflationary measure to protect seniors' incomes; and, it led an energy policy coalition to protect seniors from high energy costs.

NCSC became embroiled in presidential politics again in 1980. Senator Ted Kennedy strongly wooed NCSC in his ultimately unsuccessful bid to win the Democratic nomination, going so far as to invite NCSC to hold its next national convention in the White House.

NCSC became even more politically active in the 1980s. The organization fought a number of battles over funding for Social Security and Medicare, inflation and economic policy, heating and energy policy, and affordable housing for the elderly.

In 1984, Congress enacted the Environmental Programs Assistance Act. Within the act was a program called the Senior Environmental Employment (SEE). This program provided funds for people aged 55 or older to be employed by the United States Environmental Protection Agency (EPA) with the ability to respond more rapidly to emergency situations and provide ongoing support for long and short-term projects. In 1986, NCSC became a recipient of SEE funds as well. That same year, NCSC started its first political action committee.

In 1996, NCSC began the process of spinning off its government-funded, senior-employment and housing programs. It established a new division called the National Senior Citizens Education and Research Center (NSCERC), which continued to administer the SCSEP funds. The two organizations later formally separated, although many NCSC board members continued to serve on the NSCERC board. (NSCERC later changed its name to Senior Service America, Inc.)

== Decline, reorganization and name change ==
In May 2000, the AFL-CIO executive council voted to dissolve NCSC, and reform the group as the Alliance for Retired Americans. Labor-leaders also wanted to reform the group as a tax-exempt nonprofit to which tax-deductible donations could be made. The reorganization also meant that AFL-CIO members could now automatically enroll their retirees as members rather than ask them to sign up. The "new" organization was officially launched in May 2001.

Since its relaunch in 2001, the Alliance has been very active politically. It fought against the Republican-endorsed Medicare prescription drug benefit in 2005, and President George W. Bush's Social Security privatization-reform plan in 2004. The Alliance endorsed the Patient Protection and Affordable Care Act in 2009, and protested against Rep. Paul Ryan's 2010 budget proposals, and proposals by the President's National Commission on Fiscal Responsibility and Reform to cut Social Security benefits.

The Alliance has also clashed with AARP. The Alliance has often said it is not a competitor with AARP; and, that it wishes to work in cooperation with the much larger seniors' group. However, during the 2003 debate over the Medicare prescription drug benefit, the Alliance broke with AARP and publicly criticized AARP's leaders for being out of touch with seniors and caving in to financial incentives (AARP offers a number of health insurance products, some of which might have suffered had a more generous prescription drug benefit been enacted).

Barbara Easterling, who had served as the first woman Secretary-Treasurer of the AFL-CIO in 1995, was the president of the Alliance from 2009 to 2015 when she was succeeded by Robert Roach.

== Structure and governance ==
Membership in the Alliance is defined quite broadly. Members of NCSC were automatically made charter members of the Alliance, giving the new organization a sizeable membership base. Any retired union member is eligible for membership in the Alliance. Retired workers who were not union members may become full members as well.

Member dues are $10 a year. The dues of retired union members are paid by each national union (with a cap of $100,000, which is adjusted annually). Some AFL-CIO unions pay the dues out of their budgets, rather than assess their retirees or members a special fee to pay the dues. Non-union retirees pay dues of $10.00 a year.

Alliance members are the governing body of the organization. The membership meets in a national convention every non-presidential election year. The membership elects a president, a secretary-treasurer, a community-based executive vice-president, and six community-based board members. There is no provision for proportional representation within the Alliance; every member may attend the national convention and vote, and sponsoring unions may send as many delegates as they choose. The membership also discusses and approves policies; raises voluntary donations for the organization's political operations.

Between conventions, the Alliance is governed by a national executive board.

The Alliance has four executive officers as well. These are the president, secretary-treasurer, community-based executive vice-president, and an executive vice-president appointed by Alliance affiliates. These four officers oversee the day-to-day operations of the organization. The Alliance also has an executive director, who oversees the staff and implements the policies of the organization.

In 2022, the Alliance's officers are:

- Robert Roach, Jr., president. Roach started his career as a ramp serviceman for TWA in 1975 and was a member of the International Association of Machinists and Aerospace Workers (IAM) Local Lodge 1056 in New York. He was elected to and held several union leadership positions including serving as the General Secretary-Treasurer of the IAM from 2012 until his retirement in July 2015. He currently serves as an Auditor for the International Trade Union Confederation and is a board member of the Pension Rights Center.
- Joseph Peters, Jr., secretary-treasurer. Peters began his career at the Ford Motor Company. He was elected to a leadership position in the United Auto Workers (UAW) in 1978 and rose through the UAW ranks, culminating in his serving as regional director of UAW Region 1.
- Fred Redmond, executive vice-president. Redmond is also the secretary-treasurer of the AFL-CIO. He is the first African American to hold this office in the history of the labor federation. He had previously served on the federation's Executive Council since 2008.
- Julie Horwin, executive vice-president. Horwin was elected Executive Vice President of the Alliance in 2022. She taught in the Arizona public school system for 32 years and is a proud representative of 400,000 NEA Retired members.

Executive Director:

- Richard Fiesta. Fiesta has been the executive director of the Alliance since 2013. He served in the Clinton Administration in congressional and public affairs positions at the Departments of Labor and the Interior and the Pension Benefit Guaranty Corporation. Fiesta also has extensive experience on Capitol Hill.

== Alliance Achievements ==
The Alliance works closely with the White House and Congress to ensure that seniors’ issues like retirement security and prescription drug prices get the attention they deserve. Its members educate and mobilize retirees to participate in national, state and local elections and the Alliances publishes an annual Congressional Voting Record. Members are also active at the state and local levels, advocating on behalf of retirees on issues such as health care, housing, transportation, and consumer protection. Examples of their work include:

- Lawsuits to protect vote by mail and absentee voters in Florida, Maine, Michigan, Minnesota, North Carolina, Pennsylvania, Texas, and Wisconsin in 2020;
- 2016 Senate Battleground Voter Education;
- Stopping the “Chained CPI”

== Educational Fund ==
The Alliance also sponsors a separate Alliance for Retired Americans Educational Fund. The Fund has its own board (although it is interlocking to a significant degree with the Alliance's), staff and budget. The Fund's primary activities are threefold: To conduct research and produce publications on public policy issues of importance to retired citizens; to build state Alliance affiliates by assigning staff, training state staff, and build state retiree coalitions; and to build coalitions of retiree, community, worker and nonprofit groups to support the work of the Fund and the Alliance. The Fund also conducts a number of other educational and training conferences, seminars and workshops.

Since 2013, the ARA has encouraged and helped older American reach and have access to polls and petitions to vote on bills concerning Medicare and Medicaid. Bringing the petitions to the doors of those the bills will concern has made it possible for their voices to be heard on issues that affect their day-to-day lives. The ARA has taken a much more hands-on approach in recent years to ensure that the needs of retired Americans will not be ignored
