= Joe Beam =

American sexologist and author

Joe Beam is an American sexologist, marriage and relationship expert and best-selling author. Beam began his career as an ordained minister, but then moved on to found and run several organizations for helping married couples, and is also known as an inspirational speaker. He has appeared on national television programs, including The Today Show and Good Morning America, and has been the subject of media coverage concerning his work in marriage and sexuality education.

== Career ==
Beam earned a bachelor's degree, graduating magna cum laude, from Southern Christian University. He subsequently pursued graduate studies in clinical psychology at the University of Evansville and earned a PhD in health science from the University of Sydney, focusing on sexual satisfaction.

In the 1970s, he started his career as a church minister. After a tumultuous divorce and remarriage, he then founded Family Dynamics Institute in 1994 with a mission to save marriages and train couples on love, marriage and sex. He has also wanted to help conservative Christians enjoy their personal sex lives without feeling guilt for religious reasons. He believes that sex is important to marriages, and espouses scriptural interpretations which allow for more liberal attitudes towards things like certain sex acts which are seen as forbidden by others. Beam has given seminars to give Christians a more advanced sex education in terms of what the Bible allows, as well as an opportunity to discuss taboo topics they would normally be ashamed of. He ran Family Dynamics until parting ways with them over disagreements with other leaders over some of his attitudes towards sex and sexuality.

Afterwards, he founded the organizations Love Path International in 2008 and then Marriage Helper in 2012. Marriage Helper offers courses, coaching, and workshops for couples seeking relationship support.

== Select bibliography ==
- 1998 Seeing the Unseen: A Handbook for Spiritual Warfare (ISBN 1878990276)
- 1998 Forgiven Forever: The Full Force of God's Tender Mercy (ISBN 1878990667)
- 1999 Becoming One: Emotionally, Spiritually and Sexually (ISBN 1-58229-362-7)
- 1999 Families: Seven Steps to Building a Strong Family (ISBN 1-58229-080-6)
- 2002 Seeing the Unseen: Preparing Yourself for Spiritual Warfare (Expanded) (ISBN 1-58229-273-6)
- 2003 Getting Past Guilt: Embracing God's Forgiveness (ISBN 1-58229-294-9)
- 2006 The Real Heaven: It's Not What You Think (ISBN 1-89243-553-5)
- 2009 Your Love Path (ISBN 0615251676)
- 2010 The True Heaven: Not What You Thought, Better Than You Expected (ISBN 0891126430)
- 2012 The Art of Falling in Love (ISBN 978-1451649338)
