= Sharon Brehm =

American psychologist (1945–2018)

Sharon Stephens Brehm
- Born: April 18, 1945; Roanoke, Virginia, U.S.
- Died: March 30, 2018 (aged 72); Bloomington, Indiana, U.S.
- Education: Duke University (B.A., Ph.D.); Harvard University (A.M.)
- Known for: Past president of the American Psychological Association
- Scientific career
- Fields: Social psychology

Sharon Stephens Brehm (April 18, 1945 – March 30, 2018) was an American psychologist who served as president of the American Psychological Association (APA). She was a professor of psychology at the University of Kansas. She held administrative roles at Binghamton University and Ohio University, before becoming chancellor of Indiana University Bloomington.

== Early life and career ==
Brehm was born in Roanoke, Virginia on April 18, 1945. She earned an undergraduate degree in psychology from Duke University. She went to Harvard University for an AM in clinical psychology and then returned to Duke to earn a PhD in clinical psychology.

Brehm spent 15 years at the University of Kansas, where she taught psychology and directed the honors program. She served as dean of arts and sciences at the Binghamton University from 1990 to 1996. She later served as provost at Ohio University and she was chancellor at Indiana University Bloomington between 2001 and 2003.

She served as the 2007 president of the APA. During her term, the organization created the Presidential Task Force on Integrative Healthcare for an Aging Population, APA-SRCD Task Force on Math and Science Education (with the Society for Research in Child Development) and the Presidential Task Force on Institutional Review Boards and Psychological Science.

== Personal life and death ==
Brehm met psychologist Jack Brehm when she went to work for him as a graduate assistant. The couple got married in 1968. Though they divorced several years later, they continued to work together and even co-authored a book. Jack Brehm constructed the theory of reactance and Sharon adapted it to the clinical psychology setting.

In a 2013 interview, Brehm discussed her Alzheimer's disease diagnosis, the early symptoms of which had appeared in 2010. She died from complications of the disease on March 30, 2018, at the age of 72.

== Works ==
- Psychological Reactance: A Theory of Freedom and Control (with J. W. Brehm, 1981)
- Intimate Relationships (with Rowland Miller and Daniel Perlman, multiple editions)
