= Dorothy Tennov =

American psychologist (1928–2007)

- Born: Dorothy J. Tennow; August 29, 1928; Montgomery County, Alabama, U.S.
- Died: February 3, 2007 (aged 78); Harbeson, Delaware, U.S.
- Education: Brooklyn College (BA, 1950); University of Connecticut (MA, 1954); University of Connecticut (PhD, 1964)
- Known for: Limerence
- Spouse: Howard S. Hoffman
- Children: 3
- Scientific career
- Fields: Psychology; Romantic love
- Institutions: University of Bridgeport
- Thesis: Performance on two-choice, non-spatial discrimination learning problems by nursery school children of normal IQ (1965)

Dorothy Tennov (born Dorothy J. Tennow; August 29, 1928 – February 3, 2007) was an American psychologist who invented the term "limerence". Her 1979 book, Love and Limerence: The Experience of Being in Love, has been called the seminal work on romantic love (also called "being in love", or passionate love in psychology) and credited as largely marking the start of data collection on the phenomenon.

== Early life and education ==
Tennov was born in Montgomery County, Alabama. She received her BA from Brooklyn College in 1950, then did postgraduate education at the University of Connecticut, where she received her MA in 1950 and PhD in 1964. (Note: Dorothy Tennov's obituary states that she received her PhD from the University of Bridgeport; however, she has stated in her collected works that her PhD is from the University of Connecticut, and she is listed in their commencement program (under her married name). The obituary appears to be incorrect.)

== Career ==
Tennov was a professor of psychology at the University of Bridgeport in Connecticut for twenty years. Her professional interest in romantic love began in the 1960s, when two young men told her that breakups had driven them to alcoholism and losing a semester at university, respectively. In her studies, Tennov administered questionnaires, collected diaries and other personal accounts, and interviewed over 500 people on the topic of love.

In 1976, Tennov traveled to Paris, where she interviewed the French novelist and essayist Simone de Beauvoir for a PBS television station, WNED-TV. It was on the flight home from this interview that she is said to have discovered that limerence is not a universal human experience, finding that her longtime friend Helen Payne was unfamiliar with it. This is when she decided to invent a new term ("limerence").

In addition to publishing Love and Limerence (1979), Tennov made a name for herself as a critic of psychotherapy. She commented in 1976 that narcissism was becoming a common diagnosis at the time, because therapists seldom saw clients who had never been to therapy before. According to Tennov, "The people who go are a relatively small group who become therapy junkies."

In 1986, Tennov left her post at the University of Bridgeport to become an independent researcher. She moved to Millsboro, Delaware, in 1987, where she lectured at a local senior learning academy and volunteered at a nursing home. Near the end of her life, she was working on a play, and a book about the public and scientific reactions to the concept of limerence.

== Personal life ==
Tennov grew up in New York City. She was married in 1952 to the psychologist Howard S. Hoffman, and they had three sons together, but they later divorced. Their son Randall died of leukemia in 1993. Tennov was a feminist, enjoyed classical music, gardening, and playing piano (having owned a Steinway), and had a small white dog "with an ear-splitting bark". She states in her collected works that she is "the victim of a disorder that adversely influences social interactions" and that she experienced job discrimination and sexism, despite ending up as a tenured professor. She died in 2007 in Harbeson, Delaware, at the age of 78.

== Publications ==
Tennov published several nonfiction books, articles in scientific and educational journals, scientific book reviews, presentations at scientific meetings, essays on aspects of women's social conditions, and a prize-winning play about life in a nursing home.

- Psychotherapy: The Hazardous Cure; Abelard-Schuman; 1975 (ISBN 978-0200040280)
- Super Self: A Woman's Guide to Self-management; Funk & Wagnalls; 1977 (ISBN 978-0308102736)
- Love and Limerence; Scarborough House; 1979 (ISBN 0-8128-6286-4)
- Love and Limerence: The Experience of Being in Love; Scarborough House; 1999 (ISBN 978-0-8128-6286-7)
- A Scientist Looks at Romantic Love and Calls It "Limerence": The Collected Works of Dorothy Tennov; The Great American Publishing Society; 2005

== Sources ==
- Bellamy, Tom (April 8, 2025). Smitten: Romantic obsession, the neuroscience of limerence, and how to make love last. Watkins Media Limited. ISBN 978-1-78678-915-0.
- Fisher, Helen (2016). Anatomy of Love: A Natural History of Mating, Marriage, and Why We Stray (Completely Revised and Updated). W. W. Norton & Company. ISBN 978-0-393-34974-0. Archived from the original on February 18, 2024.
- Hatfield, Elaine (1988). "Passionate and Companionate Love". In Sternberg, Robert (ed.). The Psychology of Love. Yale University Press. pp. 191–217. ISBN 9780300045895. Archived from the original on May 25, 2024.
- Tennov, Dorothy (1999). Love and Limerence: the Experience of Being in Love. Scarborough House. ISBN 978-0-8128-6286-7. Archived from the original on March 27, 2023.
- Tennov, Dorothy (2005). A Scientist Looks at Romantic Love and Calls It "Limerence": The Collected Works of Dorothy Tennov. Greenwich, Ct.: The Great American Publishing Society.
