= Romance =

Love focused on feelings

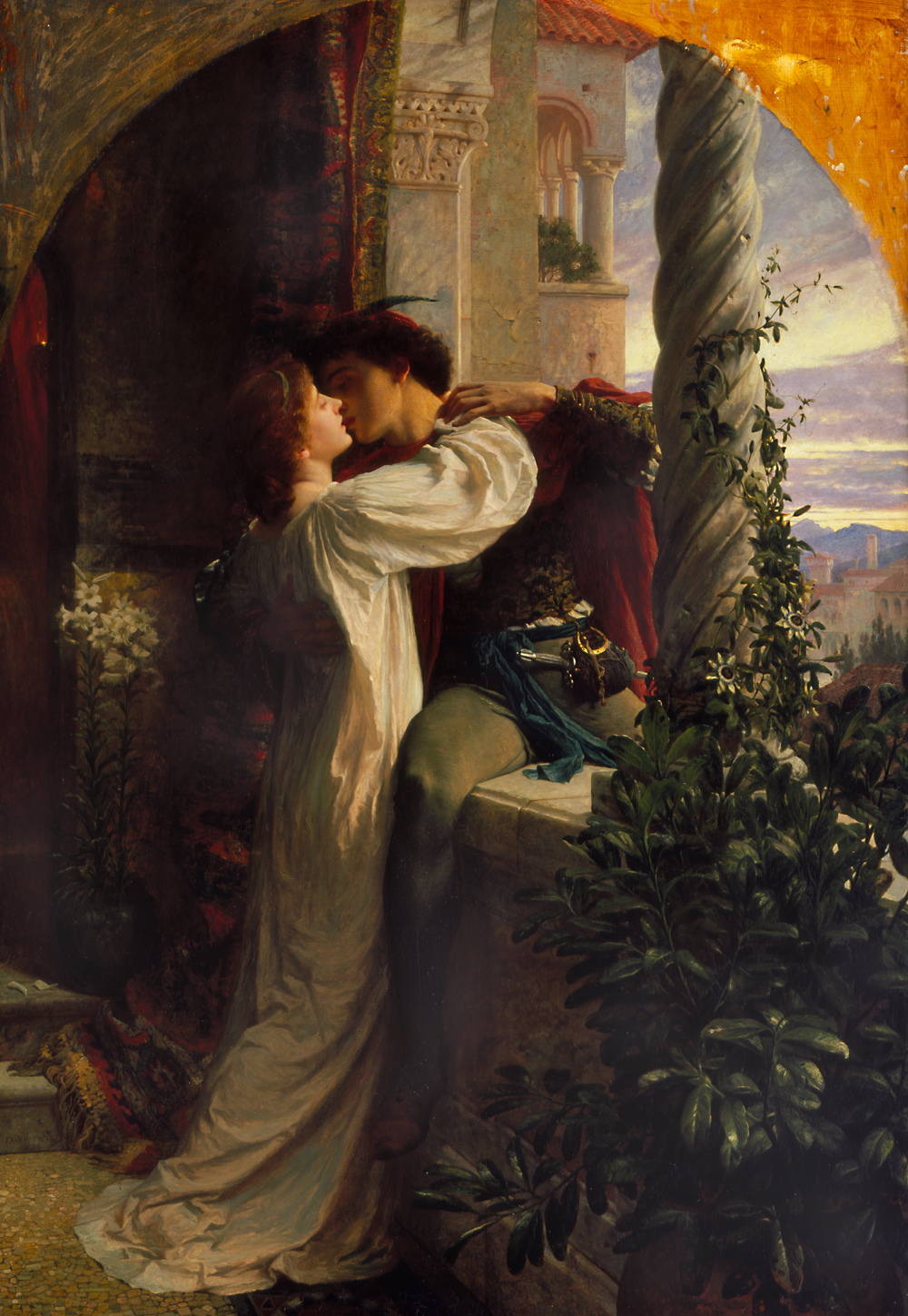
Romeo and Juliet, by Frank Dicksee, considered to be the archetypal romantic couple, depicting the play's iconic balcony scene

Romance and romantic love encompass a number of ideas about love, which are interrelated for historical and cultural reasons: (Note: Scholars do not agree on a unified set of terms or definitions for these concepts.)

- passionate feelings of attraction—a mental state of "being in love", with focused attention (salience) towards a specific individual for courtship or pair bonding;
- the cultural practice or idealization of initiating intimate relationships for feelings like these, over more practical or ordinary concerns;
- a relationship or love affair initiated or maintained this way, which may be premarital or absent a commitment; and
- a love story involving these elements.

In psychology, romantic love is considered to be a motivation or drive, which is distinct from (but related to) the concept of attachment.

The terms romance and romantic love are used with multiple definitions, which can be contradictory at times. The philosopher Arthur Lovejoy once wrote that "The word 'romantic' has come to mean so many things that, by itself, it means nothing."

Collins Dictionary defines romantic love as "an intensity and idealization of a love relationship, in which the other is imbued with extraordinary virtue, beauty, etc., so that the relationship overrides all other considerations, including material ones." The concept of romantic love also came to represent the idea of individualistic choice in marriage and sexual partners, although it's rarely realized fully and can be a source of both gratification and disappointment in relationships.

People who experience little to no romantic attraction are referred to as "aromantic".

== General definitions ==
The meaning of the term romantic love has changed considerably throughout history, making it difficult to easily define without examining its cultural origins. The term is used with multiple definitions by academics. In Western culture, the term may be used indiscriminately to refer to almost any attraction between men and women or which includes a sexual component (heterosexual, homosexual, or otherwise), although romance and love are distinguishable concepts. According to the psychotherapist Robert Johnson, the conflation is based on a kind of confusion over terms, with a cultural history of idealizing falling in love and passion-seeking over more ordinary concerns like affection and commitment.

The term is often used to distinguish from other types of interpersonal relationships (conjugal, parental, friendship), and in contrast to the modern interpretation of platonic love (which precludes sexual relations). The notion that romantic love only occurs within a relationship of some kind, however, has been called a misconception. It has also been argued that romantic love can actually be "platonic" in some cases, for example, as in the case of a romantic friendship which involves passionate feelings without sexual desire.

In academic fields of psychology, the term romantic love might be used in reference to any of the common definitions (courtly love, romantic idealization, being in love, etc.). The psychologist Dorothy Tennov once criticized the reactions to romantic love in the scientific literature as "confused and contradictory". (Note: Tennov's research study (published in her 1979 book, Love and Limerence) has been credited as largely marking the start of modern romantic love science. The researchers Ellen Berscheid and Elaine Hatfield made important early contributions to the field as well, and their tentative theory of passionate love is cited by Tennov in a discussion of the Romeo and Juliet effect. Berscheid and Hatfield are known for their work in the field of interpersonal attraction, in an era when romantic love was not yet explicitly studied. Hatfield designed the Passionate Love Scale later, in the 1980s.)

=== The literary tradition ===
From all ills mine differs;
It pleasures me;
I rejoice in it;
My illness is what
I want
And my pain is my health!
I don't see, then,
of what I complain,
For my illness comes to
me of my own will;
It is my own wish
that becomes my ill,
But I find so much
pleasure in wishing thus
That I suffer
agreeably,
And so much
joy with my pain
That I am sick
with delight

— Chrétien de Troyes (Note: Chrétien de Troyes has been characterized as the most important author of medieval verse romance.)

The word romance is derived from the Latin word Romanus, meaning "Rome" or "Roman". In the modern day, the word is used with multiple connotations, but its history has a connection to the telling of love stories. After the fall of the Roman Empire, a Latin adverb Romanice (from Romanus) became used to mean "in the vernacular" to identify languages which were derivatives of Latin, when Latin itself was used in more formal contexts at the time. In Old French (one of the Latin derivatives), this later became romans or romanz, which referred both to the language itself, and also to works composed in it. In the Middle Ages, this romans/romanz took on a meaning as referring specifically to a type of narrative verse about chivalry and love (called chivalric romance).

Some of the earliest literature containing themes considered "romantic" in a more modern sense was written by French poets known as troubadours—initially often exploring themes of unrequited love, and emphasizing the worship of a lady (a "cold, cruel mistress"). Poets like Chrétien de Troyes were encouraged by royalty to compose works exemplifying certain ideals (now called "courtly love"), (Note: The term "courtly love" (French: "amour courtois") was coined by the French medievalist Gaston Paris, in 1883.) notably in the towns of Poitiers and Troyes; later, Andreas Capellanus was influenced by this culture to write The Art of Courtly Love. Courtly love also became emphasized as a theme for chivalric romance, a popular form of literature at the time. The French word romans was anglicized into romance, and initially the term romantic love referred to those attitudes and behaviors of courtly love. (Note: Until the end of the 18th century, the word "romantic" was used to refer to chivalric romance, and aspects of the genre. One early reference (1700) to the phrase "romantic love" is made in reference to the novel Don Quixote, about a knight driven mad by reading chivalric romance.)

Courtly love involved themes elevating the status of the woman, of passionate suffering and separation, and a transformation of the lovers to another plane of existence. This is said to have originated from the troubadour poetry and the work by Capellanus, although they were also influenced by even earlier works. Often, stories inspired by this tradition are depictions of tragic or unfulfilled love. Some examples of "romantic love" stories in this vein are Layla and Majnun, works of Arthurian legend (i.e. Lancelot and Guinevere), Tristan and Iseult, Dante and Beatrice (from La Vita Nuova), Romeo and Juliet and The Sorrows of Young Werther. (Note: Strictly speaking, "courtly love" originally referred to the cultural phenomenon which flourished in 12th-century France, although the meaning of the term is imprecise. The literary style spread to other areas, such as Britain, where Arthurian legend was created, which has also been called courtly love. Italian Renaissance writers in the 13th and 14th centuries (e.g. Dante and Petrarch) were influenced by the tradition. Shakespeare (16th–17th centuries) and other writers in his time advocated for love to be a basis for marriage. Goethe and Romanticism later came in the 18th century with a literary tradition resembling courtly love, but with modified ideals. The entire historical movement has been referred to as "romantic love", or "romantic tradition".) Rather than always being pessimistic, however, others expressed an early "humanistic" perspective on passion—that is, idealizing "human love" in contradiction to religious ideals or social interference—as in the happy ending found in Aucassin and Nicolette. The modern romance novel as it's known today (e.g. by Jane Austen) emerged during the 18th-century period of the larger movement.

Modern depictions of this type of love story are in Twilight (Edward Cullen and Bella Swan), and Star Wars (Anakin Skywalker and Padmé Amidala).

The courtly and romantic traditions are said to have influenced attitudes towards love in Western culture, attitudes which continue to be present in the modern day. (Note: Some authors have considered the "courtly" and "romantic" ideas of love to be identical, but this direct connection through history has been overstated. According to Irving Singer, "Concepts of courtly and Romantic love belong to disparate (though intersecting) philosophical traditions", and the modern idea of romantic love largely originates from around the time of David Hume and other contemporaneous developments. Hume was an 18th-century philosopher who argued that "reason is and ought to be the slave of the passions". However, Singer states that "Having said all this, we may now agree that the Western concept of love (in its heterosexual and humanistic aspects) was—if not 'invented' or 'discovered'—at least developed in the twelfth century as never before.") The cultural movement is critiqued for promising a kind of "story-book" or "fairy-tale" love when the stories themselves actually involve depictions of suffering and tragedy, perhaps making the culture "blind to love's madness". According to the cultural critic Denis de Rougemont, "Happy love has no history—in European literature. And a love that is not mutual cannot pass for a true love." (Note: Denis de Rougemont is a notable 20th-century theorist who argued that the medieval troubadours were secretly Cathars, and that romantic love sprung forth from this as a kind of religious heresy (against Christianity) "by people whose spirit, whether naturally or by inheritance, was still pagan". Irving Singer has called de Rougemont's version of history a kind of "propagandistic inaccuracy". An alternative theory is that troubadour poetry was influenced by Arab works, like Layla and Majnun.)

=== Romantic beliefs ===
In the social sciences, the term romantic love has been used to refer to the idealization of a love relationship, reminiscent of the attitudes depicted in the literary tradition. The set of beliefs associated with the phenomenon is also called romanticism. (Note: This is only partially connected to Romanticism, the movement which came out of Germany near the end of the 18th century. The Romantic movement had some origins in a classic romantic novel by Goethe, The Sorrows of Young Werther, and went on to affect cultural attitudes towards love and marriage, but it also had wider concerns. "Romanticism" is another term which is complicated to define.) Lovers with romantic beliefs and attitudes tend to idealize their loved one and live in a world of fantasy. They believe in a "soul mate" or "one true love", and believe that "true love" will last forever. They believe that "true love" will overcome all obstacles, that love is the only legitimate basis for selecting a mate, and that one should "follow their heart" and reject reason and rationality. Romantic love in this sense is contrasted with rational, practical, pragmatic, or realistic love.

Stanton Peele, who pioneered the concept of "love addiction", has criticized the romantic cultural ideal as being "less critical and evaluative"—therefore underlying "unhealthy extremes" he says of addictive relationships, lovesickness, and limerence.

Love addiction is then a primary manifestation of individual aberrance in a society whose values "hold out the possibility of falling in love as a life solution, where love is seen as a transcendent experience and as a rite of passage into adulthood, and where social life is organized almost entirely around being with the one you love".

Peele considers the view of Erich Fromm, that love "chiefly engages a person's concern for others", suggesting one looks beyond basic attachment theoretical concerns (parallels between love and infant attachment) to include healthy growth along several avenues.

1. Judging more appropriate love objects.
2. Learning from one's experiences, and avoiding self-destructive patterns.
3. Expanding awareness of life opportunities beyond one core attachment.
4. Recognizing one's obligations towards one's lovers, and other people.

=== Being in love ===
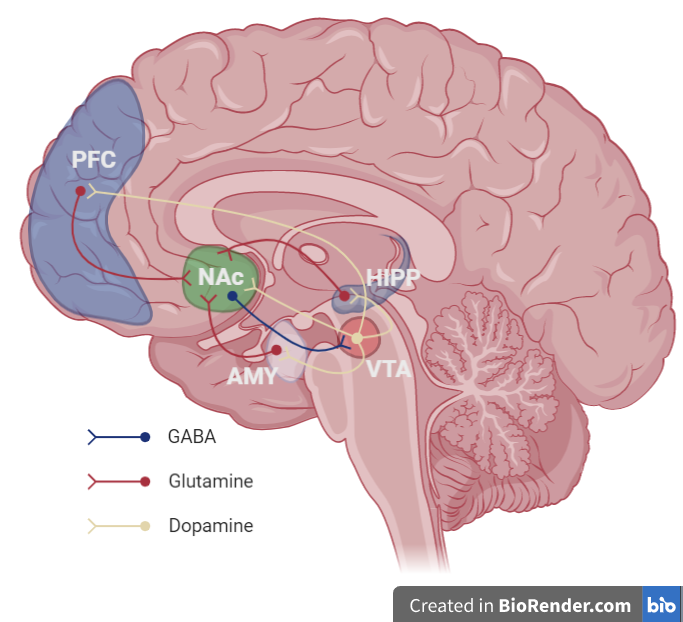
Dopamine is produced in the ventral tegmental area (VTA) of the brain, and projected to the nucleus accumbens (NAc). Dopamine activity in the NAc is key to the attribution of salience.

Researchers use romantic love to refer to the mental state which laypeople might refer to as "being in love". A variety of other terms are also used to refer to this, including passionate love, infatuation, limerence, obsessive love, eros (ancient Greek concept) and eros/mania (love styles).

The evolutionary anthropologists Bode & Kushnick undertook a comprehensive review of romantic love from a biological perspective in 2021. They considered the psychology of romantic love, its mechanisms, development across the lifespan, functions, and evolutionary history. Based on the content of that review, they proposed a biological definition of romantic love:

Romantic love is a motivational state typically associated with a desire for long-term mating with a particular individual. It occurs across the lifespan and is associated with distinctive cognitive, emotional, behavioral, social, genetic, neural, and endocrine activity in both sexes. Throughout much of the life course, it serves mate choice, courtship, sex, and pair-bonding functions. It is a suite of adaptations and by-products that arose sometime during the recent evolutionary history of humans.

Romantic love is not necessarily "dyadic", "social" or "interpersonal", despite being related to pair bonding. Romantic love can be experienced outside the context of a relationship, as in the case of unrequited love where the feelings are not reciprocated. People in love experience motivational salience for a loved one (focused attention, associated with "wanting" a rewarding experience), which is mediated by dopamine activity in the brain's reward system. Because of this and other similarities, it has been argued that romantic love is an addiction (which can be positive when reciprocated), but academics do not agree on when this is the case, or on a definition of "love addiction".

Some authors also consider companionate love and attachment to be romantic love, or consider romantic love to be an attachment process. According to a contemporary model of the brain systems involved with romantic love, the attachment system is active during the early stage of romantic love, in addition to the later stages of a relationship. The attachment system has been associated with oxytocin, which has been found circulating in people experiencing romantic love. Oxytocin may be a source of salience for a loved one, due to its activity in motivation pathways in the brain. Oxytocin is projected from the hypothalamus to reward areas, which is believed to modulate salience in response to social stimuli. Endogenous opioids are also believed to be involved with romantic love, associated with the hedonic (or "liking") aspect of rewarding experiences.

An fMRI experiment of people who were in happy, long-term relationships but professed to still be "madly" in love with their partners found that the participants showed brain activations in dopamine-rich reward areas (interpreted as "wanting" or "desire for union"), but also in an area rich with opiate receptors ("liking"). Unlike people who were newly in love, these participants also did not show activity in areas associated with anxiety and fear, and reported far less obsessional features (intrusive thoughts about a loved one, uncertainty and mood swings—features which are compared to infatuation or limerence). Usually romantic love inside a relationship lasts for just about a year or 18 months.

=== Love styles ===
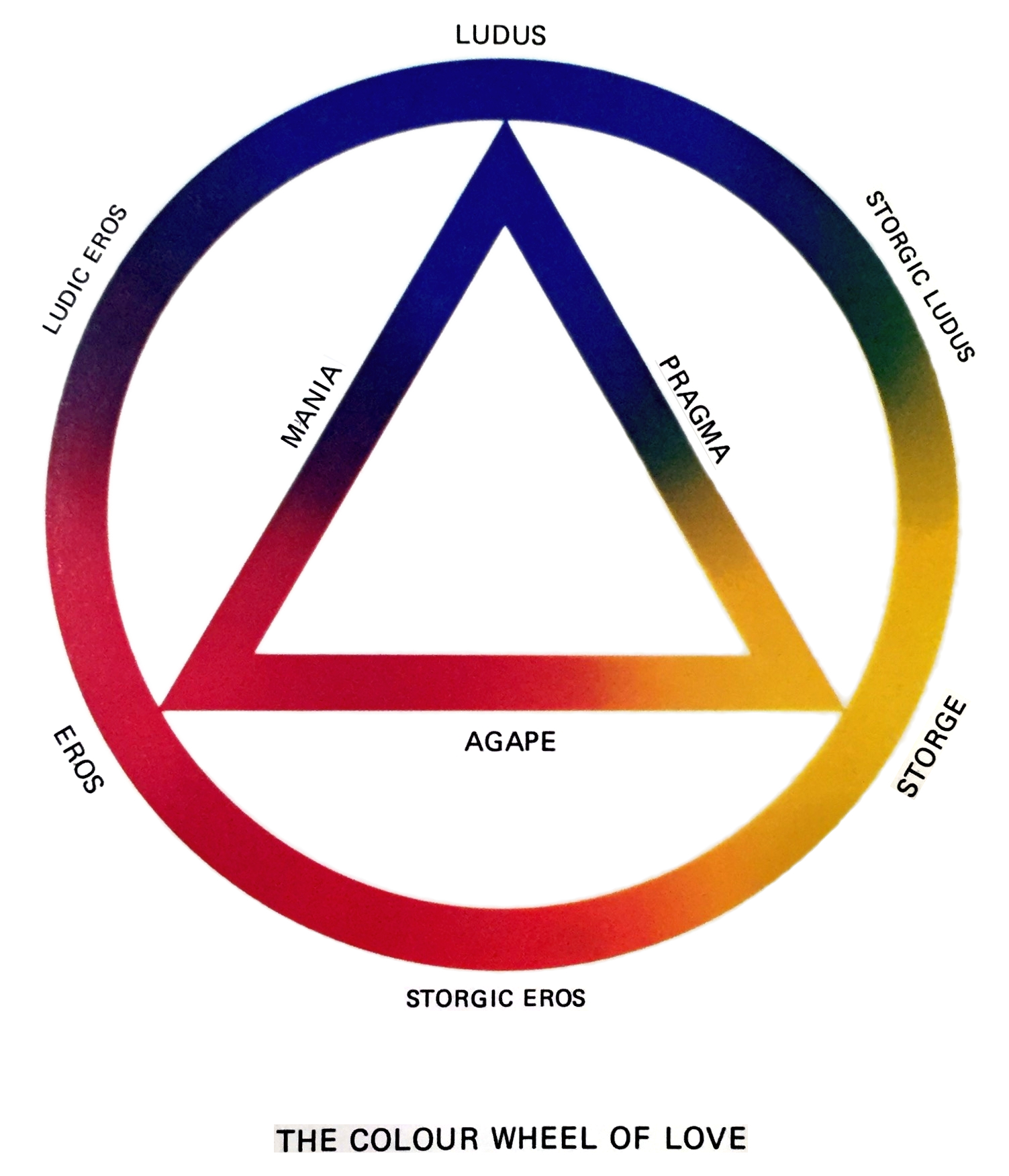

One of the problems with "love" is that the word can be used to refer to so many different things. The sociologist John Alan Lee invented the concept of a "love style" to distinguish between different types of "love stories", or the plethora of possible ways to love another person. People usually have a preferred or "favorite" love style, but this can change over a lifetime, and they can also have different love styles with different people.

Lee has stated that the elements of romantic love may actually correspond to several of his love styles: eros (erotic love, or love of beauty), mania (comparable to limerence, obsessive love, or love addiction), and ludus (game-playing, non-committal love). Of these, eros and mania most correspond to the experience of falling in love. A manic lover falls in love with somebody inappropriate in many cases (a stranger, or even somebody they don't actually like), and tends to experience relationship difficulties. Mania is most closely compared to eros, the romantic style in search of an ideal physical type. Eros lovers are more self-assured and tend to fall in love in a less chaotic way. Eros is considered to be more positive than mania.

The most common romantic theme in the literary tradition is tragedy or self-destruction, and Lee associated the ideology of courtly love with the mania love style in particular. According to Lee, Western culture came to view mania as a legitimate basis for mate selection through the courtly and romantic traditions. This replaced the medieval Christian doctrine that marriage should focus on family values and child care. Lee stated in 1973 that mania was "the most prevalent ideology of love in the modern world".

=== Limerence ===
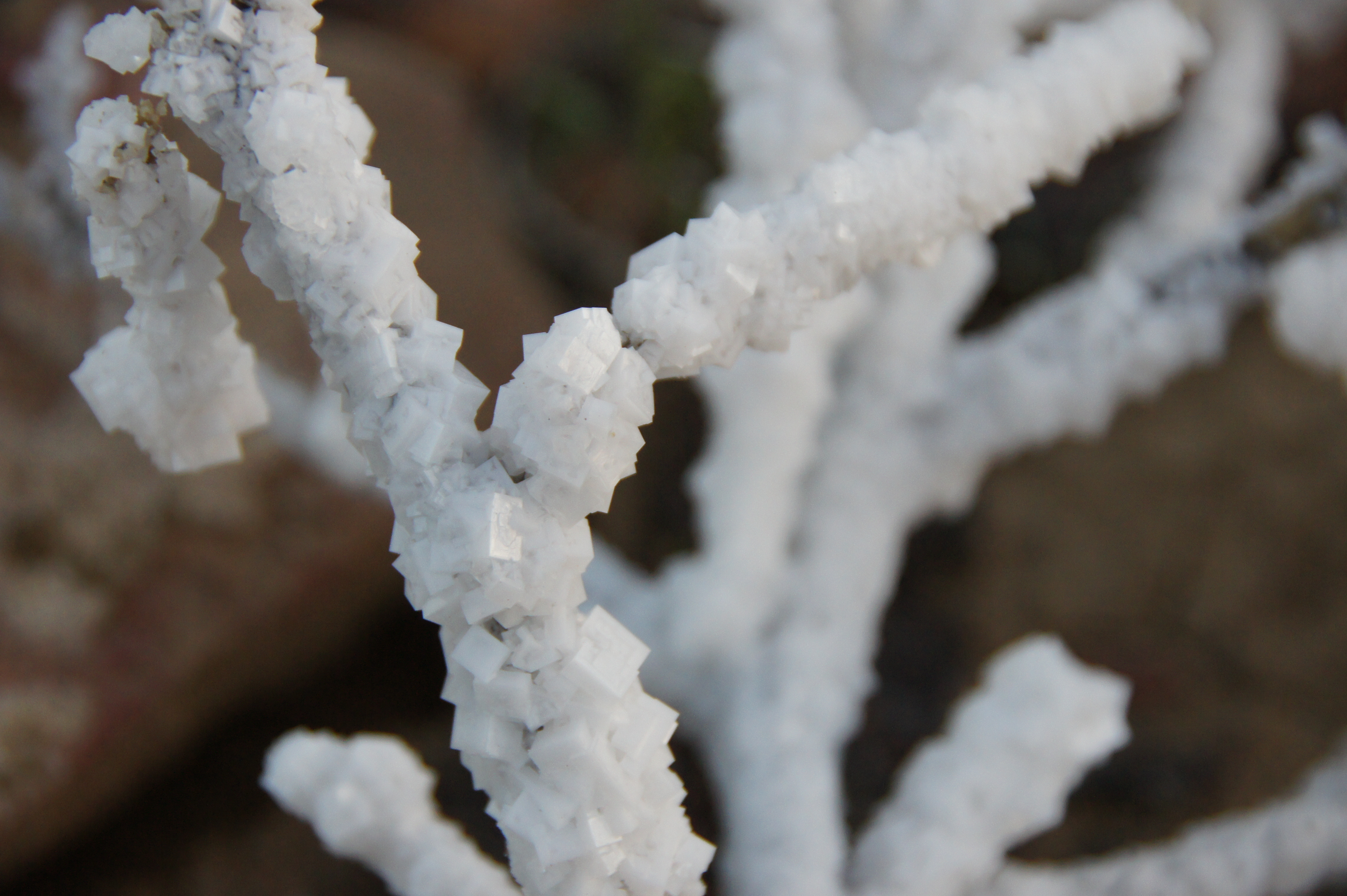
"Crystallization" was coined by the 19th-century French writer Stendhal to refer to the tendency of a person in love to overemphasize the positive aspects of their loved one and overlook the negative ("love is blind"). This idealization is now considered positive illusions, and significant scientific evidence has shown that it contributes to relationship satisfaction, long-term well-being and decreased risk for relationship discontinuation.

Limerence is a term coined by the psychology professor Dorothy Tennov, to refer to the kind of love madness or "all-absorbing" infatuated love depicted in romantic love literary works. Limerence is usually unrequited in reality, and turns into a lovesickness which can be debilitating and difficult to end.

Tennov identified key components of limerence, including:

- idealization (or "crystallization") of the loved one, called the "limerent object", or "LO".
- intrusive thoughts and constant fantasizing about the limerent object.
- uncertain reciprocation intensifying the feeling and causing emotional volatility.

According to Tennov's research, limerence is normal (despite being a madness); however, she also encountered people who had not experienced it (whom she calls "nonlimerent") and were in fact unaware the stories depict a real phenomenon. Tennov indicated limerence may be experienced by 50% of women and 35% of men, and a 2025 survey found that 64% of people had experienced it and 32% "found it so distressing that it was hard to enjoy life". In Tennov's conception, limerence can be reciprocated and result in a relationship, but there must be obstacles (as in Romeo and Juliet) for a mutual preoccupation to intensify.

Tennov complains in her book (and as recently as 2005) that not only are some people unaware the phenomenon is real, but that the scientific community does not properly distinguish it either. Terms like romantic love, passionate love, and being in love are all used to refer to limerence, but also to other things. Another type of attraction pattern frequently described to her by informants (who also felt they were "in love") was a more companionate style she calls affectional bonding, which emphasizes compatibility of interests, mutual preferences, ability to work together and pleasurable sex. Some informants would also speak of "obsession", yet not report intrusive (unwanted) thoughts, only "frequent and pleasurable" ones.

Limerence has been compared to Lee's mania, with both Tennov & Lee having taken inspiration from courtly love.

== Origin of romantic love ==
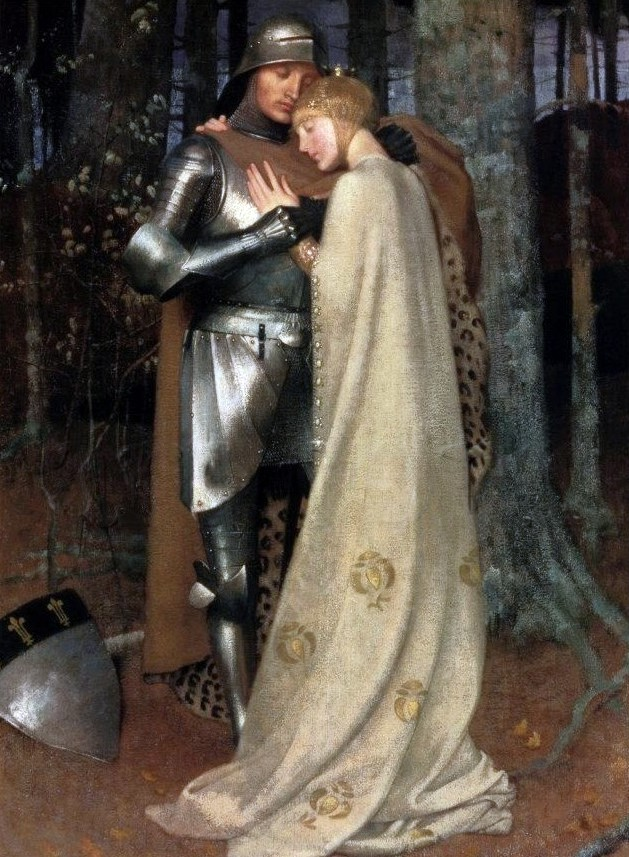
Aucassin and Nicolette, by Marianne Stokes

=== Evolutionary anthropology ===
Romantic love is believed to have evolved in hominids about 4.4 or 2 million years ago (depending on the theory), although the exact time has not been identified yet. It has been associated with a suite of psychological characteristics, and brain scan experiments using fMRI have shown that it activates reward areas in the brain. One prominent evolutionary theory developed by the anthropologist Helen Fisher states that romantic love is a brain system evolved for mammalian mate choice (also called courtship attraction), an aspect of sexual selection, for focusing energy on a preferred mating partner. In most species, courtship attraction is only brief (lasting minutes, hours, days or weeks), but Fisher believed that over the course of evolutionary time, it became prolonged and intensified in humans. Another prominent theory states that romantic love re-purposed brain systems which were originally for mother–infant bonding, via an evolutionary process called co-option (or exaptation). Both types of love share similar features (preoccupation, exclusivity of focus, longing for reciprocity and idealization), and brain scans have shown overlapping areas.

It has been claimed on the basis of certain ethnographic reports that romantic love is limited to Western culture, and does not exist in tribal societies throughout the world. For example, the anthropologist Audrey Richards lived among the Bemba people in the 1930s, and once told them a folk story about a young prince who "climbed glass mountains, crossed chasms, and fought dragons, all to obtain the hand of a maiden he loved". The Bemba, however, became bewildered by the story, prompting an old chief to ask the question "Why not take another girl?" Margaret Mead studied the Samoans, and also believed that deep attachments between individuals were a foreign idea to such societies: "Romantic love as it occurs in our civilisation, inextricably bound up with ideas of monogamy, exclusiveness, jealousy and undeviating fidelity does not occur in Samoa." The tribal mentality, according to Nathaniel Branden, is that the family ought to exist for the optimization of physical survival. The individual is subordinate to the tribe "in virtually every aspect of life", with emotional attachments given little importance.

A 1992 cross-cultural study by William Jankowiak and Edward Fischer, however, found that the experience of romantic or passionate love was in fact universal, or near-universal. This study looked at 166 cultures with relevant ethnographic reports, folklore and other available material from the Standard Cross-Cultural Sample. Romantic love was indicated as present in a culture if at least one account was found of either personal anguish and longing, love songs or folklore highlighting romantic involvement, elopement due to mutual affection, a native's affirmation of passionate love, or an ethnographer's affirmation of romantic love. On that basis, passionate love was documented in 88.5% of cultures. For the other 11.5%, the authors believed the lack of record was probably due to ethnographic oversight rather than a genuine absence. It is therefore argued that although not everyone falls in love, it is the case that in almost every culture some people do, even in those cultures where romantic love is muted or repressed.

A 2025 study of non-WEIRD (Western, Educated, Industrialized, Rich, and Democratic) cultures, with lifestyles more similar to ancestral societies, provided further evidence that romantic love is universal. The societies in the study included Aboriginal Australians, Bhotiya from India, Fulani and Igbo from Nigeria, Hadza and Meru from Tanzania, Kimeru from Kenya, Nepalis from Kathmandu, and Tsimane from Bolivia. The researchers used triangular theory of love, and found high levels of intimacy, passion, and commitment reported across all of the cultures being studied.

Cover of Zhuchun yuan (The Garden of Spring Residence) written by Wuhang Yeke, an 18th-century Chinese caizi jiaren ("scholar and beauty") romantic novel, a type of romantic fiction

Despite being evolved and a cross-cultural experience then, the phenomenon is still influenced or constrained by culture in a variety of ways. The attitudes towards it and specific practices can vary drastically from culture to culture. Chinese culture, for example, does not have a typical "romantic love" culture equivalent to the United States, although the Chinese have an extensively documented literary romantic heritage. It was considered "bourgeois", and even outlawed during the Cultural Revolution. The puritanical injunctions have long since been dismantled, however, a "shyness" remained in the culture, which is not identical to that of the West. Divorce is allowed, but arrangement is also common, and there's much talk of "protecting the family". A cross-cultural survey in the early 1990s found that Chinese people thought Western ideas about love were inaccurate, and that Chinese participants linked "passionate love" to concepts like "infatuation", "unrequited love", "sorrow" and "nostalgia". Many seemed to as much want to "fall in love" as to develop a mental illness.

=== Genetics ===
Scientific studies have investigated the contribution of genetics to romantic love, using the Love Attitudes Scale (LAS). The LAS is an instrument designed to measure the six love styles created by John Alan Lee (i.e., eros, ludus, storge, mania, agape & pragma).

In 2007, researchers from the University of Pavia led by Enzo Emanuele investigated the relation between love attitudes and the dopamine and serotonin pathways, by examining the association with polymorphisms in several neurotransmitter genes. This study found that the eros love attitude was associated with the DRD2 (dopamine receptor) TaqI A genotypes. A trend was observed in the study for higher scores on eros according to the number of A1 alleles, which has previously been associated with lower DRD2 density. (D2 receptors are inhibitory.) Such a difference is hypothesized to result in a deficiency such that the reward is enhanced from pleasant experiences, consistent with some of the "addictive" features of eros, such as a need for daily contact and a desire for exclusivity. Additionally, the mania love attitude was associated with the 5HT2A (serotonin receptor) C516T genotype, which has also been associated with obsessive–compulsive disorder.

In behavioral genetics, one tool which is valuable for determining genetic influence is the twin study, which compares identical twins (monozygotic, who are genetically identical) and fraternal twins (dizygotic, who are only 50% genetically related, like other siblings). The differences between the two types of twins are used to estimate how much of a given trait is heritable (how much the individual differences in a group, i.e. variance, can be accounted for by genetic differences between individuals), and how much is environmental. Environmental contribution is further split between shared environment (which makes family members more similar) and nonshared environment (which makes them different, but for mathematical reasons also includes measurement error).

In 1994, a twin study co-authored by Phillip Shaver investigated the genetic and environmental influence on love attitudes. This study found that individual differences in love attitudes are almost exclusively due to environmental influence, with genetic factors having very little influence for most love attitudes (from most-to-least heritable: mania, storge, pragma & eros), and even no influence at all for others (ludus & agape). The authors interpret the result as meaning that love styles may be influenced by one's childhood familial environment (for shared environment) and unique experiences with parents, peers, adolescent and adult lovers, and so on (for nonshared environment). Of these, the influence from the nonshared environment was larger than the shared environment.

According to Lee's earlier research, typical eros lovers recall a happy childhood, while typical manic lovers recall an unhappy one.

=== Personality ===
Using the Love Attitudes Scale, styles of romantic love have also been correlated with different personality measures: eros (with agreeableness, conscientiousness, extraversion & secure attachment), mania (with neuroticism & anxious attachment), and ludus (with avoidant attachment). For other love styles: storge (friendship love, with agreeableness & insecure attachment), pragma (practical love, with conscientiousness & insecure attachment), and agape (selfless love, with secure attachment).

The formation of attachment styles is complicated, often being attributed to childhood, but with twin studies finding both genetic and environmental contributions. There is also a problem called a person–situation debate, where people can have different attachment styles with different people, for example, an avoidant partner can make a secure partner feel and act anxious. Lee identified a kind of transitional love style he called "manic eros", where the lover is "moving either toward a more stable eros or toward full-blown mania". Some are typical erotic lovers under a temporary strain (moving toward mania), while others are typical manic lovers with a self-confident and helping partner (moving toward eros).

=== Romance and sexuality ===
In the Western tradition of ideas, romantic love and sexual desire have been closely linked, although still considered separate. Many writers have used terms like "romantic love", "erotic love" and "sexual love" interchangeably, without the relation being made clear. In the 2000s, a scientific consensus emerged that romantic love and sexual desire are actually functionally-independent systems, with distinct neural substrates. On the basis of the evolutionary theory that romantic love co-opted mother–infant bonding for some of its underlying brain systems, it has been argued that it's possible to fall in love without experiencing sexual desire. This theory originally by the psychologist Lisa Diamond states that it would not have been adaptive for a parent to only be able to bond with an opposite sex child, so the systems must have evolved independently from sexual orientation. For this reason, it's even possible sometimes for people to fall in love in contradiction to their usual orientation.

The theory is used to explain the phenomenon of romantic friendships which involve passionate feelings without sexuality, and other instances of "platonic" attachments and infatuations. Some documented examples are intense, but non-sexual bonds between Native American men, schoolgirls falling "violently in love with each other, and suffering all the pangs of unrequited attachment, desperate jealousy etc." (historically called a "smash"), and women who considered themselves to be otherwise heterosexual experiencing limerence for an older woman (a love madness compared to "hero worship").

=== Reward and self-expansion ===
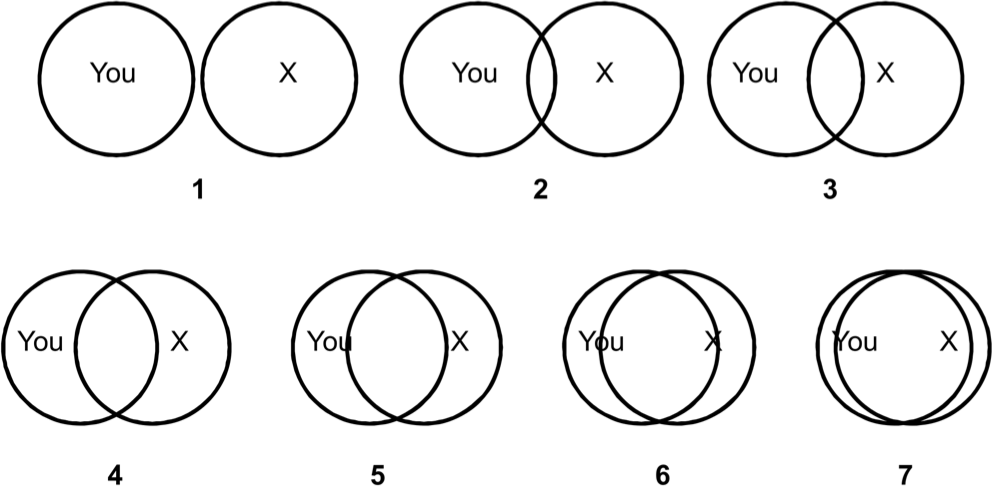
Inclusion of the other in the self (IOS) is typically measured with the IOS Scale.

The self-expansion model of interpersonal relationships was developed in the 1980s by the psychologists Arthur & Elaine Aron, specifying that the psychological reward from falling in love or an intimate relationship is "whatever creates expansion of the self". Self-expansion is the human motivation to expand one's physical influence, cognitive complexity, social or bodily identity, and self-awareness. Relationships are a key area for self-expansion then, via "inclusion of the other in the self", where aspects of a partner (e.g. traits, skills, attitudes, resources, abilities, and worldviews) are incorporated into one's own self concept.

Self-expansion is used to explain the "strong attraction" of romantic love, including intense varieties of passionate love or limerence, when the rate of expansion is rapid and approaches the maximum total possible from all sources. Additionally, self-expansion explains how even unrequited love can be a desired experience.

Early research on interpersonal attraction identified five predictors of attraction, incorporated into the theory by the Arons.

- Similarity, also known as "birds of a feather flock together".
- Propinquity, in other words similarity of location, and also the mere-exposure effect.
- Being liked, which tends to also cause liking in return, called reciprocal liking.
- Matching of admirable characteristics, so people tend to pair with those who have similar attractiveness, called the matching hypothesis.
- Social and cultural influences, which constrain who people are likely to meet, and what is considered attractive or important.

According to self-expansion, attraction should result from the opposite of these five predictors (because, for example, similarity would seem to minimize self-expansion—resulting in less attraction). Therefore, the Arons propose that these are five preconditions which make a relationship possible, whereas attraction according to self-expansion increases when an opposite condition is present. For example, a person may be attracted to similarity when it provides the basis for effective communication or predictability, whereas differences provide the basis for self-expansion: new challenges, new experiences, new resources, etc. Self-expansion also suggests that people would prefer to maximize admirable characteristics (rather than matching), and that people would occasionally violate social norms as an opportunity for autonomy.

Passion seems to decline when interactions with a love object become frequent, showing that both propinquity and distance can facilitate attraction. Accordingly, in the tradition of medieval romance, the love object was always inaccessible, and modern people still seem to be "obsessed with the unknown, mysterious lover".

=== Barriers to fulfillment ===
It has been reported by many theorists (and even agreed) that adversity actually tends to heighten romantic passion. Obstacles like rejection, parental, spousal or other interference, physical separation, temporary breakups, or uncertain situations spark interest and emotional volatility. Ambivalence is "potent fuel for passion", and an unobtainable person makes the feeling all the more powerful. The curious phenomenon has been called the "Romeo and Juliet effect", or "frustration attraction". According to Dorothy Tennov, "The recognition that some uncertainty must exist has been commented on and complained about by virtually everyone who has [seriously studied] romantic love." Ellen Berscheid and Elaine Hatfield observed that passion is associated with a "hodgepodge of conflicting emotions": "It is true that some practical people manage to fall passionately in love with beautiful, wise, entertaining, and wealthy people who bring them unending affection and material rewards. Other people, however, with unfailing accuracy, seem to fall passionately in love with people who are almost guaranteed to bring them suffering and material deprivation."

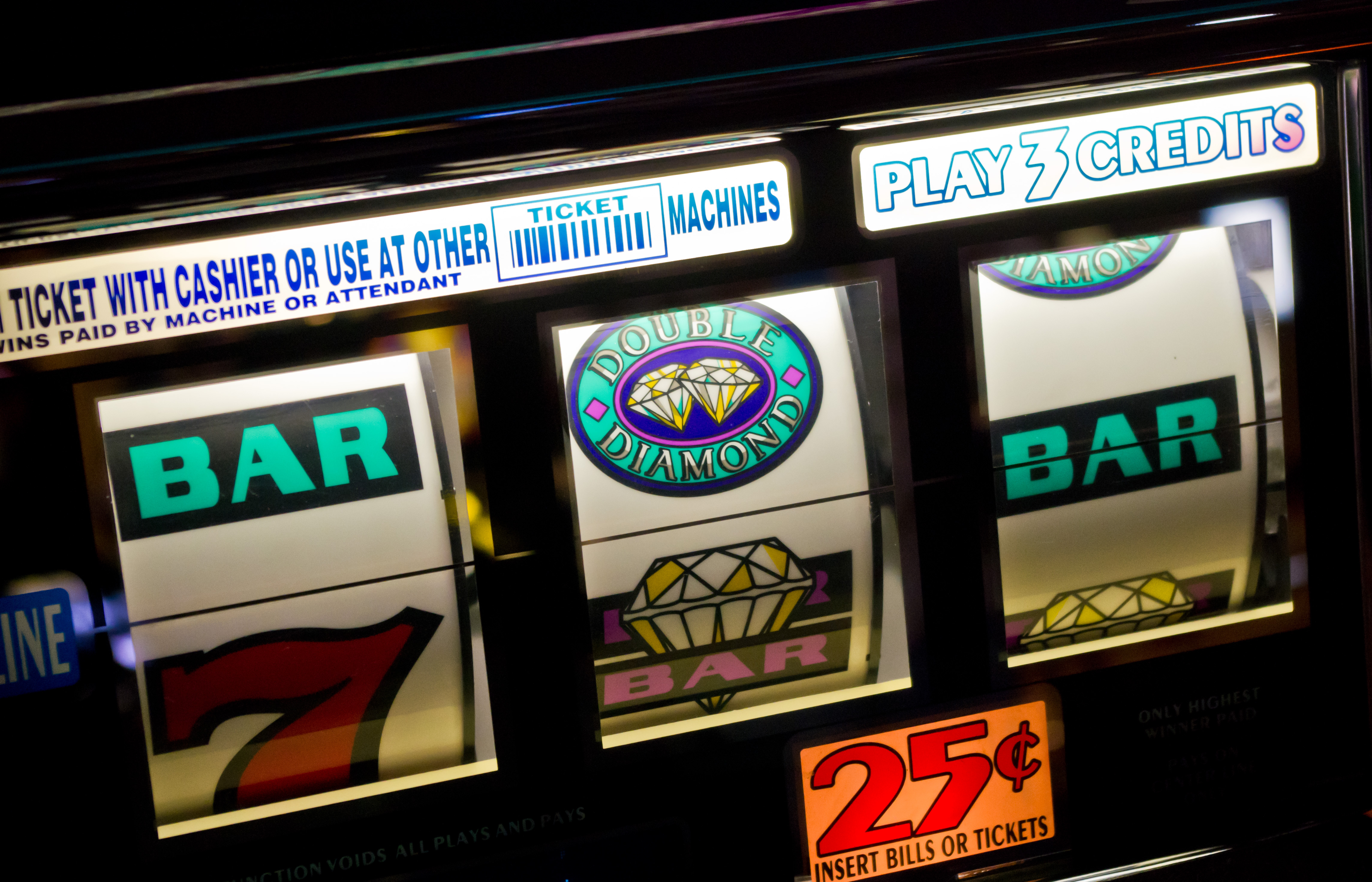
Infatuated love essentially thrives under intermittent reinforcement—also the mechanic a slot machine relies on.

Passionate or infatuated love is said to thrive under the uncertainty of intermittent reinforcement, in situations with only irregular meetings between lovers, or with ambiguous and changing perceptions over whether one's love is returned. This type of situation resembles a slot machine, for example, where the rewards are designed to be always unpredictable so the gambler cannot understand the pattern. Unable to habituate to the experience, for some people the exhilarating high from the unexpected wins leads to gambling addiction and compulsions. If the machine paid out on a regular interval (so that the rewards were expected), it would not be as exciting. Uncertain reciprocation has also been interpreted in terms of attachment anxiety. Helen Fisher believed that obstacles and confusion heighten romantic ardor (as in Romeo and Juliet) because dopamine neurons fire in anticipation of an expected reward which is delayed.

The "cold, cruel mistress" or "hard-to-get girl" is a recurring theme in the history of love literature, with the observations sometimes cynical or satirical. Socrates: "you must not offer it to them when they have had enough—be a show of reluctance to yield, and by holding back until they are as keen as can be for then the same gifts are much more to the recipient than when they are offered before they are desired". Ovid: "if you feel no need to guard your girl for her own sake, see that you guard her for mine, so I may want her the more". Andreas Capellanus: "The easy attainment of love makes it of little value; difficulty of attainment makes it prized." Bertrand Russell: "The belief in the immense value of the lady is a psychological effect of the difficulty of obtaining her, and I think it may be laid down that when a man has no difficulty in obtaining a woman, his feeling toward her does not take the form of romantic love."

Sigmund Freud believed that romantic love was generated by suppressed (or repressed) sexual desire: (Note: Sigmund Freud's views on love have been dismissed as superficial or cursory, given his reduction of the phenomenon to sex and sexuality. However, Freud has also been praised as being insightful for his time, representing an important development between ancient models like humorism and a more modern psychology. Freud identified the sometimes troubling or primitive nature of attachments, disguised under the cosmetic of "romance" and "romantic love", and the influence of prior experience (e.g. childhood) on falling in love. Freud championed reason, but had a personal run-in himself with madness after falling in love during his courtship of Martha Bernays, when acute jealousy nearly brought him to violence. Writing in hindsight, Freud implied that he viewed even normal jealousy as a semi-delusional state.) "It can easily be shown that the psychical value of erotic needs is reduced as soon as their satisfaction becomes easy. An obstacle is required in order to heighten libido; and where natural resistances to satisfaction have not been sufficient men have at all times erected conventional ones so as to be able to enjoy love. This is true both of individuals and of nations. In times in which there were no difficulties standing in the way of sexual satisfaction, such as perhaps during the decline of the ancient civilizations, love became worthless and life empty".

=== Romance and commitment ===
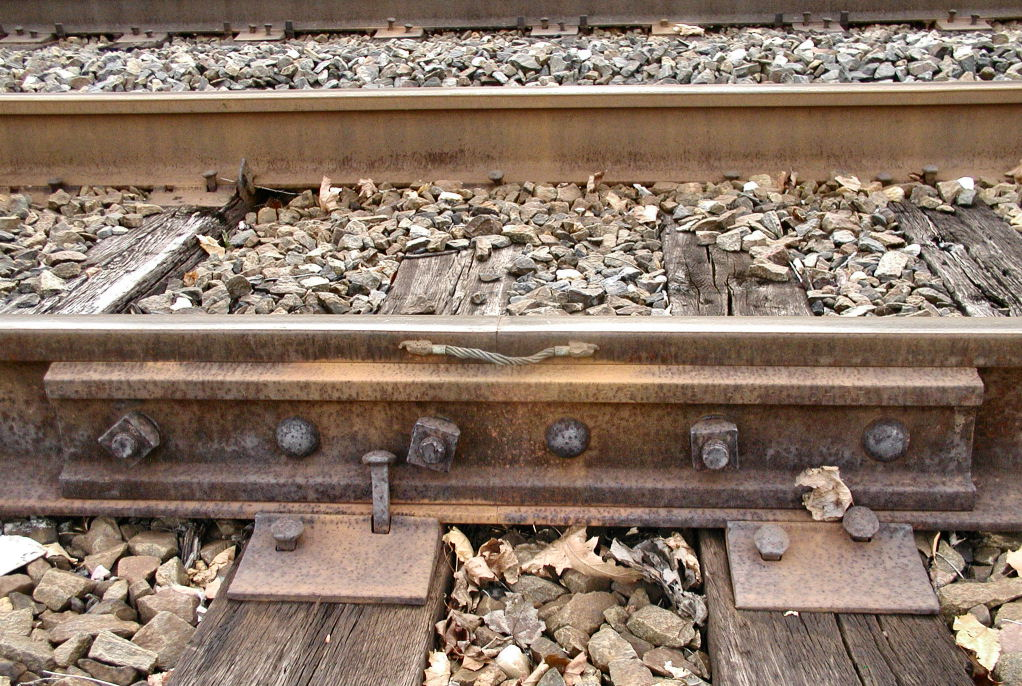
"Why does romantic love leave us bewitched, bothered, and bewildered? Could it be another paradoxical tactic like handcuffing oneself to railroad tracks?" —Steven Pinker

It has been argued that romantic love—in the sense of "being in love", or passionate love—evolved as a "commitment device" which overrides rationality to suppress the search for alternative mates. This ensures one is committed to their partner, even if a more desirable mate becomes available. Commitment would have been adaptive in our evolutionary past because of concealed ovulation, where a man can't easily tell when a woman is ovulating, requiring sex throughout the entire menstrual cycle. Romantic love also lasts long enough to keep a couple together while a mother cares for an infant. Romantic love might therefore be the reward one experiences when this problem of commitment is being solved.

The intensity of romantic love—why we become "fools for love"—can also be explained using the handicap principle, which solves a contention between "honest" and "fake" signaling. When real emotions evolve, a niche is created for sham emotions which are less risky to express (like fake facial expressions). An honest signal can evolve without becoming worthless (because of competing fakers) only if it's too expensive to fake. One example in nature is the peacock's tail: a cumbersome display which consumes nutrients. Only a healthy peacock can afford it, so it may have evolved because it was a handicap, signaling health to females of the species. According to the psychologist Steven Pinker, the way to a person's heart is to declare you're in love "because you can't help it", so romantic love might have evolved to signal true commitment.

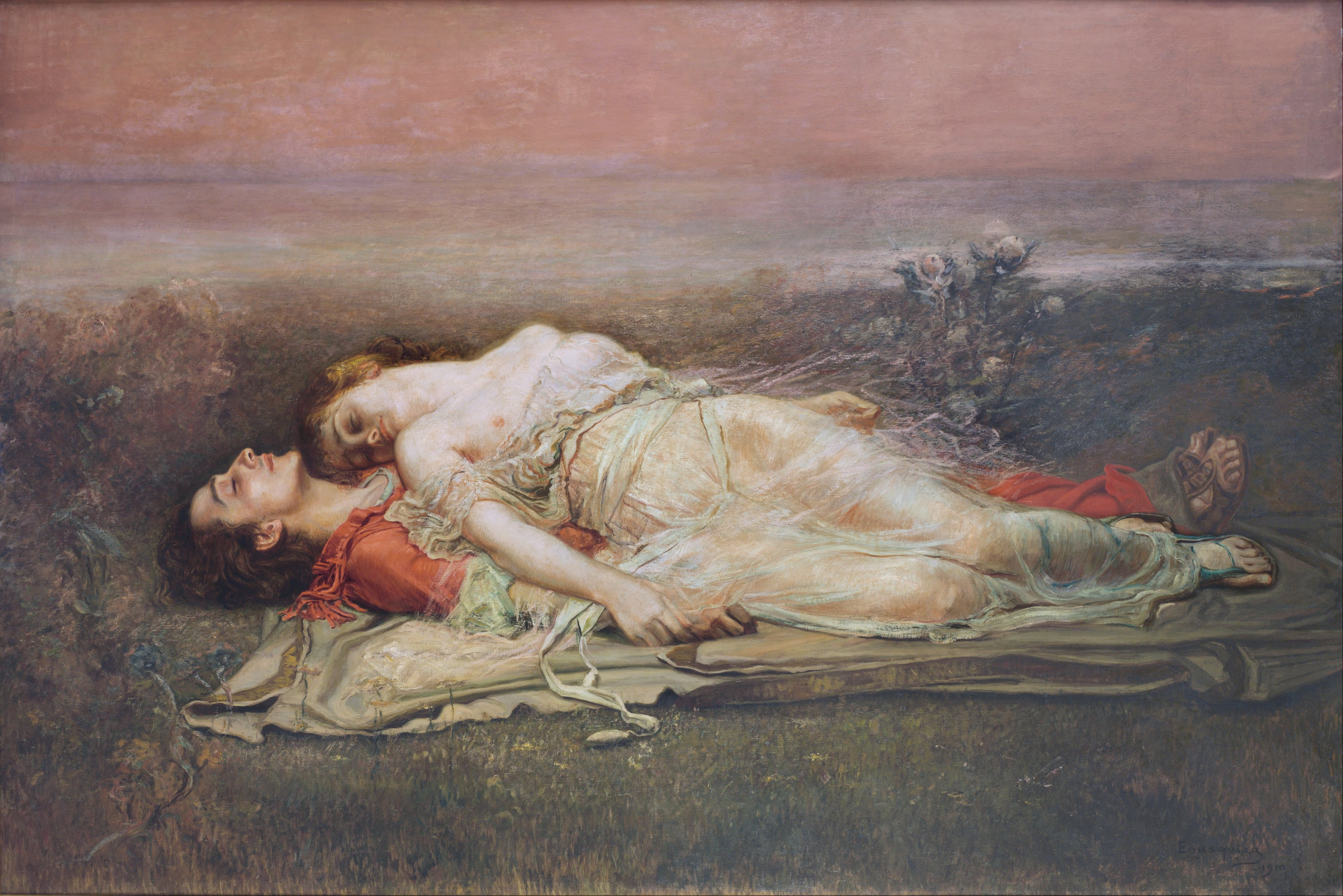
Tristan and Isolde (Death), by Rogelio de Egusquiza. "Tristan and Iseult do not love one another. They say they don't and everything goes to prove it. What they love is love and being in love. They behave as if aware that whatever obstructs love must ensure and consolidate it in the heart of each and intensify it infinitely in the moment they reach the absolute obstacle, which is death." —Denis de Rougemont

However, "romance" should be distinguished from "commitment", when "commitment" is meant in the sense of a continued willful involvement after passionate feelings fade. According to the psychotherapist Robert Johnson, Western culture has these two things "completely confused", because "If we are committed only to follow where passion leads, then there can be no true loyalty to an individual person." The values of romance—that "passion" and being "in love" are the most important, and ought to be sought after—therefore tend to be in conflict with the values of commitment.

A deceived spouse is said to be one intensifier of love madness (i.e. limerence), and this has a tendency to pull people out of their committed relationship when it happens. Helen Fisher believes that a brain architecture contributes to this, where a person can feel deep attachment for a spouse while simultaneously feeling intense romantic love for somebody else, just as sexual desire can be felt for still others. Infidelity is normally forbidden in the West, but some other cultures are more tolerant, or they define infidelity differently. John Alan Lee defines some love styles as "mixtures" (ludic eros & storgic ludus) where partners may be primarily affairs, or where such sexual liaisons may even be permitted as in the case of open marriage; he attributed this to preference.

In Robert Sternberg's triangular theory of love, "romantic love" refers to passion plus intimacy, but without commitment. Sternberg defines this in reference to Tristan and Iseult: a tragic love story, said to be the quintessential courtly romance of the Middle Ages, and the source from which all romantic literature has sprung. In this story, the two drink a love potion by mistake when Iseult is due to be married to Tristan's uncle, a king, and they become clandestine lovers. A drama ensues when their affair is discovered, Tristan is exiled, and eventually they die. Tristan (which means "child of sadness") is royalty himself, and kills a relative of Iseult's earlier in the story; Tristan and Iseult claim not to even "love" each other, aside from the potion. Iseult exclaims: "You know that you are my lord and my master, and I your slave."

Critics of romance have claimed that Tristan and Iseult have a kind of "love of death" (or "liebestod"), rather than loving each other, and use the story as an allegory to claim that passion leads to suffering. Irving Singer, a philosophy professor, has stated that the legend was not intended by its original authors to be interpreted this way, but that "only an inveterate optimist could fail to recognize the devious ways in which reality destroys love (and sometimes lovers as well)".

=== Romance and marriage ===
La Promenade, by Pierre-Auguste Renoir

Marriage as a cultural practice may only be about 4,350 years old, and historically it did not exist to bind couples for love or companionship. Especially in patriarchal societies, its original purpose was to ensure the transfer of wealth and responsibilities to a man's true biological children. In ancient Greece and Rome, they did not marry for love, and both cultures saw passion as a kind of madness. Despite the Greeks having many depictions of love in their art and mythology, if Greek men were to fall in love, it would have likely been extramarital with courtesans, or homosexual love between men. Women were subservient, segregated, and mostly kept inside and isolated. In the Middle Ages, after the fall of Rome, marriage in Europe was also regarded as economic and political. By the 6th century, it was regulated by the Catholic Church in all respects, which declared passionate love and sex to be mortal sin for any other purpose than procreation. In the 11th and 12th centuries, the phenomenon of courtly love emerged to idealize a precursor to romantic love, but only when unconsummated or in the form of adultery, not as a basis for marriage itself. At this point, marriage and love were still believed to be incompatible, and additionally the ideals of courtly love only applied to nobility.

It was not until the 18th century that people began to marry for romance. During this period, Romanticism emerged with new perspectives on individuality and egalitarianism, and through the 19th century it became a cultural question whether passion, love and companionship could become a basis for marriage. New norms were adopted, but romantic attitudes later waned and became tame throughout the Victorian era in Europe. During the 18th and 19th centuries, Puritanism also dominated the culture in post-revolutionary America, with an anti-romantic tradition. Romantic love really only flourished as a basis for marriage at the end of the 19th century and into the 20th, when men and women socialized more equally, when dating replaced other structured courtship practices, and romance became more secular and consumerist.

During the 20th century, a "transformation of intimacy" occurred, where intimate relationships became less restricted by laws, customs and morals, and feminism paved the way for new kinds of relations between men and women. The rise of the romantic marriage also coincided with the rise of divorce then, due to this heightened expectation, sensitivity to incompatibility, and increasing legal freedom. The sociologist Anthony Giddens calls a major development of this period the "pure relationship": where a relationship is entered for its own sake based on emotional communication, and only continued for as long as both parties are satisfied with the rewards derived from it. A "discourse of intimacy" emerged in the 1960s and '70s, promoted in self-help books as an attempt to ameliorate problems which were a consequence of the restructuring of personal relationships on marriage. Previously, marriage was a contractual obligation which only required adherence to law (and "romance" is seen as something one "falls" into, not an act of will); therefore, a new concept of "commitment" emerged, with the "pure relationship" marriage requiring a new kind of willful involvement previously unconceived of. Much of the discourse also focused on communication as a means to intimacy and a cure for conflict. According to David Shumway, a professor of cultural studies, one of the problems is that as with "romance", "intimacy" is elusive to define. This new conception meant something more than "companionship": it also came to entail emotional, economic, and political equality of the partners, or what Giddens calls a "democratization" of personal life and emotions.

The clinical psychologist Frank Tallis has criticized the romantic tradition as a disappointment, citing studies which actually show higher satisfaction among arranged marriages than marriages for love. In Asian and other Eastern cultures where arrangement is preferred, it's assumed that a couple will fall in love, but after their marriage, and often they do. About half of arranged couples claim to stay together for love, albeit probably not for romantic love.

Bertrand Russell, a philosopher considered influential in the 20th century, has been critical, but also optimistic about the prospects of romantic love. Despite his assertion that romantic love is only found in the difficulty of its obtainment, he also called it "the source of the most intense delights that life has to offer", and thought it important that it was socially permitted. Russell, however, critiqued the cultural movement that romance ought to be essential for marriage: "Whether the effect has been as good as the innovators hoped may be doubted. [...] In America, where the romantic view of marriage has been taken more seriously than anywhere else, and where law and custom alike are based upon the dreams of spinsters, the result has been an extreme prevalence of divorce and extreme rarity of happy marriages." According to Russell, "it should be understood that the kind of love which will enable a marriage to remain happy and to fulfil its social purpose is not romantic but is something more intimate, affectionate, and realistic". In his view, it's good that romance can lead to marriage, but as a necessity it's "too anarchic", and "forgets that children are what make marriage important".

The anthropologist and renowned love researcher Helen Fisher believed the current drive for a more passionate romance in Western partnerships (what she called a return to an "antique habit"—something she believed is natural and evolved) is good news. However, she argued in favor of a longer, more drawn out "pre-commitment" stage prior to marriage, which she called "slow love", for the purpose of becoming familiar before making a lifelong commitment.

== Modern romance ==
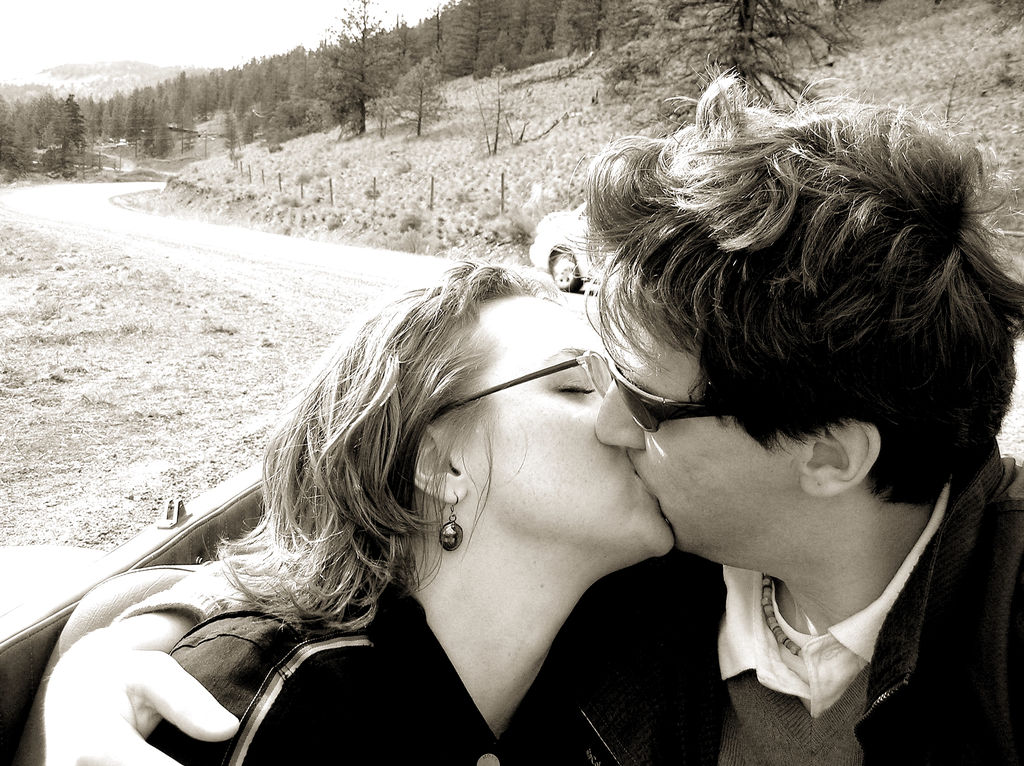
Only 46% of cultures around the world use romantic kissing.

Susan & Clyde Hendrick studied college students in 1993, and found that a friendship love style was more common than they anticipated. When asked to write about their closest friendship, 44% of participants spontaneously wrote about their significant other. The storge love style (friendship love) was also the most common love style among people who were asked to tell a story about the relationship they're currently in. The Hendricks believe their data suggests that friendship can be present as a component in the early stage of a relationship for many couples (rather than developing more slowly), and can actually precede love feelings in some cases.

In 2016, Victor de Munck and David Kronenfield proposed a cultural model for romantic love in the United States, developed with studies of people in upstate New York and New York City. The authors believe the cultural model is used as a reference standard for relationships by their informants: "People do not fit the model as much as our model can be used to explain and predict what people think, feel, and do." The American model "is unique in that it combines passion with comfort and friendship": "For successful romantic love relations, a person would feel excited about meeting their beloved; make passionate and intimate love as opposed to only physical love; feel comfortable with the beloved, behaving in a companionable, friendly way with one's partner; listen to the other's concerns, offering to help out in various ways if necessary; and, all the while, keeping a mental ledger of the degree to which altruism and passion are mutual." It's not claimed by the authors that everyone holds this model or that everyone opts for this type of relationship, only that the model is common or prototypical and most people know it at least implicitly. The model is tested with two case studies of informants who describe their difficulties finding a partner who meets all of these different criteria (passion, plus comfort and friendship).

In his 2008 book, British writer Iain King tried to establish basic rules for the early stage of romance, as an improvement over the old maxim "all's fair in love (and war)". He concludes on six initial rules, inspired by what he calls the "Help Principle", which he argues is one good basis for a mutual relationship: "Help someone if your help is worth more to them than it is to you."

There will be more, but these are the first:
1. try to assess your own feelings towards someone else in reasonable time;
2. empathize with others to assess your mutual suitability;
3. don't flirt with someone unless you might mean it, and reject unwanted advances politely but clearly;
4. do not pursue people you are not interested in, or who are clearly not interested in you;
5. underrepresent your affection to someone only if you think doing so will foster the relationship; and
6. in general, express your affection, uncertainty or disinterest clearly, unless there is a special reason not to.
— Iain King, How to Make Good Decisions and Be Right All the Time

Helen Fisher has advocated personality matches and online dating services for introductions, which she believed are effective. Contrary to previous research, however, a 2025 study found that couples who met online were actually less satisfied than those who met offline. The difference could be explained by the people meeting online tending to be less similar, or the overabundance of choice in online environments leading to less confident selections, or because of the proliferation of so-called "swipe culture", which focuses more on gamified appearance-based interactions over actual matching algorithms and profile preparation.

== Philosophy ==
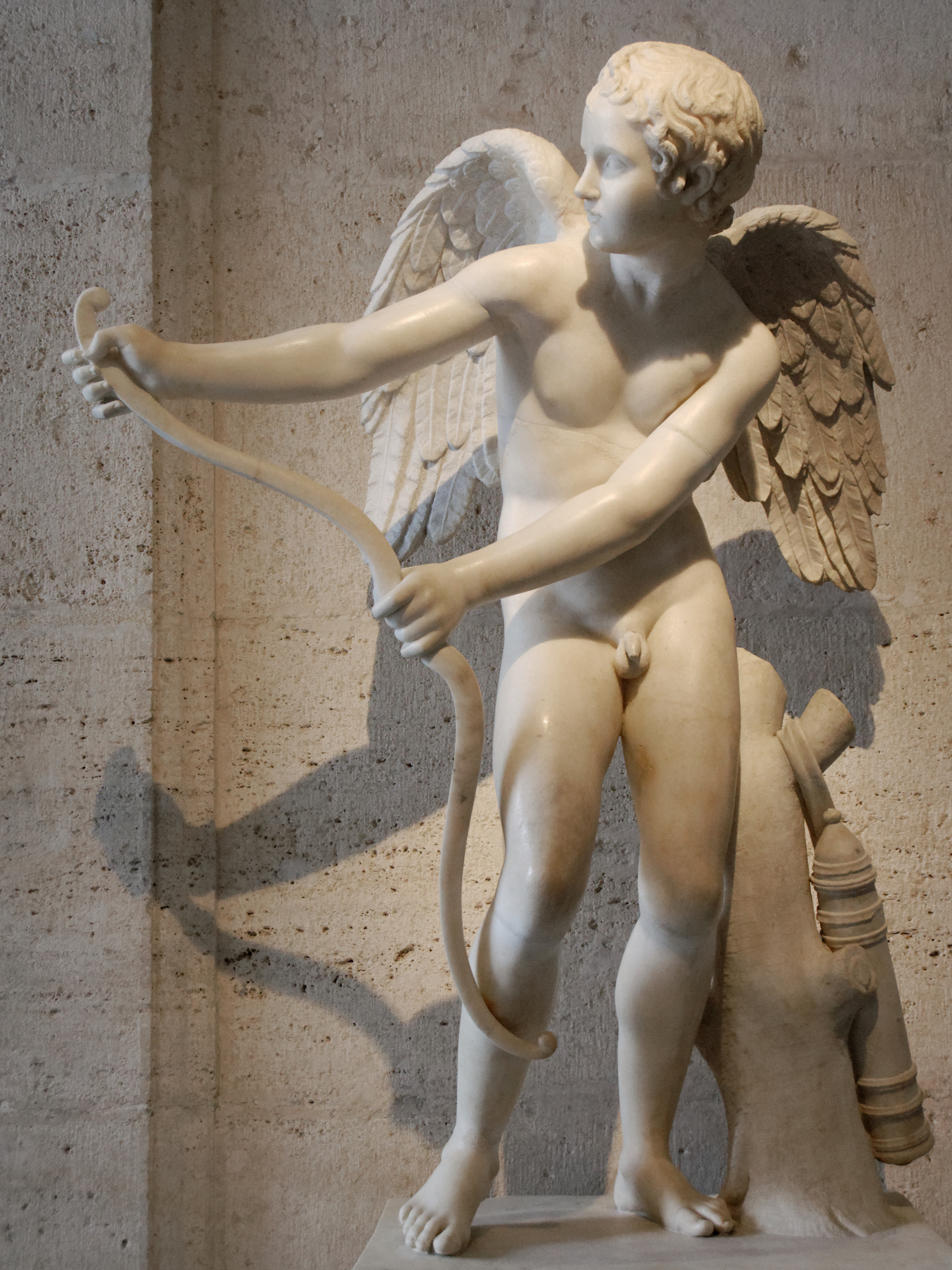
Roman copy of a Greek sculpture by Lysippus depicting Eros, the Greek personification of romantic love

=== Plato ===
The philosopher Plato wrote the first major treatment on love in the Symposium, a dialogue in which guests at a dinner party discuss the nature of Eros. Themes introduced by Plato in the Symposium went on to become pervasive in nearly all other writings on the subject of love. Plato (born c. 428 BC) has been considered the most influential of all philosophers (Aristotle being a close second), for his effect on the writings of subsequent ages.

In a speech given by Aristophanes in the Symposium, Plato presents an early idea of "merging"—the idea that love is a completion of the whole, or a reunion with one's "other half" (from which one has been separated). Later, this idea became prominent in the Romantic movement. In the Greek legend recounted by Aristophanes, humans are born incomplete and yearning for their other half, because they were originally double-headed creatures with four arms and four legs but Zeus cut them in two as a punishment for pride.

Aristophanes, however, is not viewed as a "spokesperson" for Plato in the dialogue; the speech is ironic. Socrates advocates a different account, that true love is the knowing of absolute beauty (as a metaphysical entity or idea) in which goodness is possessed, rather than only some specific instance of beauty. In Plato's theory of forms, a particular instance of a thing (such as a specific cat) only exists as an imperfect copy of a unique ideal form created by God. This ideal form is "real", whereas a particular is only "apparent". According to Socrates, only a philosopher can possess supreme knowledge of absolute beauty and therefore come to satisfy his version of love.

By possession of "the good", Socrates explains that the goal of love is "to procreate and bring forth in beauty", related to the love of immortality. Although only a philosopher's ascension can truly lead to a perpetual possession of the good, Socrates states that people also try to achieve immortality through physical means (by having beautiful children), spiritual means (by creating wisdom and virtue), or a combination where the physical beauty of another begets spiritual beauty. This particular passage of the Symposium is striking for its foreshadowing of courtly love, in which the love of the troubadours inspired them to bring forth spiritual beauty in the form of poetry, music, and noble deeds in the service of a lady. (Note: According to Irving Singer, the troubadours did not have direct access to Plato's writings, so his ideas must have come to them from Middle-Eastern Neoplatonism.)

Socrates himself is also said to be suggestive of both the troubadour's lover and their beloved, in different respects. He resembles the troubadour lover in that he defers to a woman, Diotima, as his "instructor in the art of love" and the source of his doctrine. However, Socrates also resembles the troubadour's beloved in his role as the object of affection, particularly of the young man Alcibiades, who states "I had no choice but to do whatever Socrates bade me. . . . I was utterly disconcerted, and wandered about in a state of enslavement". Diotima states that Socrates' love for young men prevents him from knowing absolute beauty, for if he could, he would spend all his time contemplating their beauty instead.

Plato's concept of love in which the lover achieves transcendence through nonsexual adoration has also been interpreted as a positive conception of passionate love—usually only between men at the time, because love and marriage were thought of as separate in ancient Greece. The ancient Greeks did have a concept of passionate, romantic love, but it was typically viewed as a madness and only depicted in literature.

=== Courtly love ===
In you reside the flowers and the verdure,
And that which glows or is beautiful to see,
Your face is more resplendent than the sun,
Who sees you not can never value aught.

In this world there is no creature
So full of beauty or of pleasure,
And he who dreaded love is reassured
By your loveliness and can no longer fear.

The ladies who make up your retinue
Please me merely through your love of them,
And I beseech them, in their courtliness,

That those who can should honor you still more
And venerate your true supremacy,
Since of all women you remain the best.

— Guido Cavalcanti (Note: According to Irving Singer, "The entire tradition of French courtly love is summed up, distilled, and clarified in a poem such as this" by Cavalcanti.)

The 12-century phenomenon of courtly love was a historical predecessor to romantic love philosophy, although both philosophies encompassed viewpoints which did not always agree or converge on a singular set of ideals.

The term "courtly love" (French: "amour courtois") was coined by the French medievalist Gaston Paris, in 1883. Under his influence, scholars at the time began to discuss the concept of a "code" or "body of rules" which supposedly pervaded medieval culture. This was further developed by C. S. Lewis in The Allegory of Love (1936), in which Lewis defined its characteristics as humility, courtesy, adultery, and the religion of love. This original formulation of the concept held that courtly love involved fundamentally illicit or adulterous attitudes—exemplified by the works of Chrétien de Troyes (e.g. Lancelot, the Knight of the Cart). This kind of idea was also advanced by the cultural critic Denis de Rougemont in his influential book Love in the Western World (1939), a literary analysis of another story de Troyes was involved with creating (Tristan and Iseult).

The original formulation has been criticized, because in reality the 12-century phenomenon was less unified, and the scholarly discussion about this became increasingly diffuse over time. Irving Singer says "I am convinced that the definition of courtly love formulated by Paris and Lewis is very misleading. But rather than eliminate the term from scholarly discourse, I think it is wiser merely to redefine the concept in a way that will accommodate the great diversity of attitudes toward love in the Middle Ages."

Singer summarizes the philosophy of courtly love as the following cluster of ideas—which often appear together, but are not necessarily present in any given author of the period:

1. sexual love between men and women is in itself something splendid, an ideal worth striving for;
2. love ennobles both the lover and the beloved;
3. being an ethical and aesthetic attainment, sexual love cannot be reduced to mere libidinal impulse;
4. love pertains to courtesy and courtship but is not necessarily related to the institution of marriage;
5. love is an intense, passionate relationship that establishes a holy oneness between man and woman.
— Irving Singer, The Nature of Love, Volume 2: Courtly and Romantic

The County of Provence pictured to the southeast, in 1030

Initially, courtly love emerged in Provence (Southern France) as a type of literature (poetry) created by poets known as the troubadours. In this earlier southern form, courtly love was often unrequited. Adultery was only introduced as a theme when the phenomenon moved northward to Aquitaine and England. A regular feature was the conflict between early humanistic ideals (where pleasure and desire can be a source of goodness) and the religious precepts of the time. Medieval Christian doctrine generally condemned sexuality as a source of pleasure. All was seen as subordinate to spiritual love (God's agape, and one's love of God in return); willfulness was even more sinful than fornication.

In the Western tradition (drawing from Plato and Aristotle), Christian religious love was defined in terms of a union with God. According to a strand of Christian mysticism, one actually merges with God in a manner reminiscent of Aristophanes' myth, although this was criticized by the orthodoxy who maintained that man can only be wedded with God while each remains distinct.

The concept of "fin'amors" ("pure love" or "true love") was then invented by the troubadours, combining elements of Christian mysticism with Neoplatonism from the Middle-East. According to Singer, the troubadours would not have thought of themselves as socially subversive. Rather, fin'amors (in its initial southern form) contextualized love in the hierarchical medieval world as subservience to a lady, who was even sometimes a legal sovereign. However, in its failure to subordinate itself to God, fin'amors encouraged self-sufficiency—seeking from human beings what according to Christianity only God provides.

France in 1154, with the Duchy of Aquitaine shown in pink

The original Provençal troubadours made no attempt to codify their views, and mainly wrote poetry. As the phenomenon spread northward, however, a new variation developed. Courtly love was introduced to the north of France by Eleanor of Aquitaine, when she married to become queen of France. In Paris, her ideas about love were introduced with opposition from her husband, King Louis; however, when she later remarried to become queen of England, King Henry in London was more sympathetic to her influence. Eleanor was sent back to France for a period when King Henry appointed their son Richard (who was only 11) to be Duke of Aquitaine. It was during this time that Eleanor presided over the so-called "court of love" at Poitiers, where nobles are said to have met and posed questions about love.

Another French royal who was influential to the development of courtly love was Eleanor's daughter, Countess Marie, who was present at Poitiers, and then later at her own capital of Troyes. Chrétien de Troyes was apparently encouraged to adopt the theme of adultery in works such as Lancelot by Marie, despite actually finding the subject distasteful himself. Marie is also believed to have directed Andreas Capellanus to write The Art of Courtly Love (c. 1185), a book which specified a set of 31 "rules of love", including the following:

2. He who is not jealous cannot love.
9. No one can love unless he is impelled by the persuasion of love.
13. When made public love rarely endures.
14. The easy attainment of love makes it of little value; difficulty of attainment makes it prized.
15. Every lover regularly turns pale in the presence of his beloved.
16. When a lover suddenly catches sight of his beloved his heart palpitates.
20. A man in love is always apprehensive.
21. Real jealousy always increases the feeling of love.
22. Jealousy, and therefore love, are increased when one suspects his beloved.
30. A true lover is constantly and without intermission possessed by the thought of his beloved.
— Andreas Capellanus, The Art of Courtly Love

Scholars have debated to what extent Capellanus intended to seriously advocate the practice of courtly love—despite likely intending to portray the conditions at Queen Eleanor's court—because in the final part of the book, Capellanus condemns courtly love as offensive to God and inimical to religious love. The book is addressed to "Walter", a young man to whom Capellanus eventually reveals that he is only teaching courtly love to so Walter can be on his guard against it. Some possible explanations are that the book was intended to be satire, or that the book is an instance of "double truth", in which natural reason and faith are each a means to different truths which may be contradictory. The book might also be read as an attempt at harmonization, by first examining the implications of courtly love in full, but then subordinating it to religious love.

Regardless, the book was later condemned by the Bishop of Paris, and banned, in 1277.

According to Frank Tallis, "At Poitiers it was decided that love—if true—must be disturbed and slightly perverse; it must be obsessive, compulsive, agitated, anxious, jealous, suspicious, clandestine, and frustrating." The book has also been interpreted as an early conception of limerence by Dorothy Tennov, who says that Capellanus describes the state "very accurately", although jealousy is not essential to limerence for Tennov. John Alan Lee considered courtly love to be the mania love style.

The Albigensian Crusade terminated the activity of the troubadours in Provence, although their poems lived on and spread as a cultural influence.

=== Romanticism ===
Our breath shall intermix, our bosoms bound,
And our veins beat together; and our lips
With other eloquence than words, eclipse
The soul that burns between them, and the wells
Which boil under our being's inmost cells,
The fountains of our deepest life, shall be
Confused in passion's golden purity
As mountain-springs under the morning Sun.
We shall become the same, we shall be one
Spirit within two frames, oh! wherefore two?

— Percy Bysshe Shelley

Like other historical movements, "Romanticism" is elusive to precisely define. Broadly speaking, however, it refers to a movement which emerged at the end of the 18th century. The Romantics had primarily aesthetic motives, rejecting Enlightenment values (which venerated reason), and emphasizing passionate individual life over utility. According to Bertrand Russell, their temper is best studied in fiction; "they felt inspired only by what was grand, remote, and terrifying", and the Middle Ages pleased them the best. The Romantic movement had much wider concerns than romantic love, however. Present day art, literature, philosophy and even politics have been influenced at least somehow by the movement. Frank Tallis calls Romanticism "the closest thing we have to a religious faith in a predominantly secular society".

The earliest figure in the movement was Jean-Jacques Rousseau, writing in Geneva, who was mainly important for his "appeal to the heart" (then called "sensibility", meaning proneness to emotion). Rousseau is known for having political ideas which influenced the French Revolution—but also kinds of totalitarianism. His philosophy additionally influenced the writings on love, by those such as Marquis de Sade, Stendhal and Immanuel Kant. Rousseau was an enthusiastic proponent of romantic love and harmonious marriage.

The Romantics admired strong passion of any kind; hence, romantic love was approved of, particularly the unfortunate kind. Initially, the movement emerged mainly in Germany, influenced by the novel The Sorrows of Young Werther (1774), by Johann Wolfgang von Goethe. The book is a tragic love story, reprising themes of courtly love. Werther falls in love with Charlotte, who is engaged and then married to another man, Albert. Werther then becomes increasingly disturbed and eventually commits suicide, by shooting himself with a pair of Albert's pistols. Charlotte does not die with Werther, but he thinks she will join him after death in some kind of transcendent union. The book inspired copycat suicides—rumored to be an epidemic, although this was probably exaggerated. One woman drowned herself in a river behind Goethe's own garden, and another killed herself with a copy of the book in her pocket. The book's power issues in part from its inspiration in a true story of Goethe's own unrequited love, and although Goethe did not commit suicide, he had an acquaintance who did.

It can be argued, however, that Rousseau and Goethe were more so precursors for their influence, rather than being representative of the movement as a whole. Furthermore, while many Romantics were optimistic (or "idealist") about the prospect of romantic love, others were more pessimistic (or "realist") and did not believe in it. Among critics of Werther, for example, romantic optimists viewed the story as a tragedy of love being thwarted by the interference of an intolerant world; however, romantic pessimists viewed the character as merely a neurotic young man who kills himself as a result of psychological disabilities. Goethe himself seemed willing to entertain either interpretation.

Romantic idealism had its peak in the poetry of Percy Bysshe Shelley, whose yearning for love is a recurring theme—evidently the most vivid aspect of love he seemed to experience. In an exemplary passage on merging, Shelley states that love is "that powerful attraction towards all that we conceive, or fear, or hope beyond ourselves, when we find within our own thoughts the chasm of an insufficient void and seek to awaken in all things that are a community with what we experience within ourselves. If we reason, we would be understood; if we imagine, we would that the airy children of our brain were born anew within another's; if we feel, we would that another's nerves should vibrate to our own, that the beams of their eyes should kindle at once and mix and melt into our own, that lips of motionless ice should not reply to lips quivering and burning with the heart's best blood. This is Love."

Shelley, however, became pessimistic at the end of his life, with a despair that even bordered on a "love of death". Bertrand Russell has claimed that Shelley's kind of optimism rested on "bad psychology", because it was only the obstacles to his desire that led him to write poetry. Russell nevertheless advocated that society ought to permit romantic love, despite his cynicism.

Arthur Schopenhauer was a pessimistic philosopher whose principal work was in the 19th century. In a sense, Schopenhauer's philosophy of love mingles with Aristophanes' myth; however, rather than being spiritual or divine, Schopenhauer explains love as nature's reproductive device, so merging serves a biological end. Passionate love is the agency by which the will carries this out, merely deluding the lovers into thinking one another is unique and worthy of their obsessive attention. According to Schopenhauer, once coitus satisfies the need for propagation of the species, the lovers' passion immediately dissipates without lasting joy. As a result, Schopenhauer denies the likelihood that passionate love would lead to a happy marriage, prompting a pessimistic dilemma: if a marriage is to be happy, it would be for reasons other than love (e.g. arrangement); however, this runs counter to the demands of the will.

The poet W. B. Yeats has been called "the last romantic" and "perhaps also the last courtly lover". His unrequited love for Maud Gonne was the inspiration for many of his poems. Gonne is reported to have said to Yeats "you make beautiful poetry out of what you call your unhappiness, and are happy in that. [...] Poets should never marry. The world should thank me for not marrying you."

== See also ==
- Biology of romantic love – Evolution and neuroscience of romantic love
- Buddhism and romantic relationships – Perspective of Buddhism on romantic relationships
- Love at first sight – Falling in long-lasting love on first sight
- Romantic comedy – Film genre
- Romantic orientation – Classification of a person's romantic attraction towards others
- Sexual relationship – Physical or emotional intimacy
- Valentine's Day – Holiday observed on February 14

Romantic practices

- Flirting – Social behavior that suggests interest in a deeper relationship with the other person
- Fraternizing – Establishment of personal relations
- Gift-giving – Item given to someone without the expectation of anything in return
  - Flowers – Reproductive structure in flowering plants
  - Candy – Sweet confection
  - Jewellery – Items of personal adornment
    - Promise ring – Ring symbolizing intent to wed
    - Engagement ring – Jewelry ring
    - Wedding ring – Finger ring which indicates that its wearer is married
- Courtship – Period in a couple's relationship which precedes their engagement and marriage
- Pet names – Phrase expressing affection
- Baby talk – Type of speech associated with an older person speaking to a child
- Intimacy – Physical or emotional intimacy
  - Eye contact – Form of nonverbal communication
  - Hugging – Form of endearment
  - Holding hands – Form of physical intimacy
  - Kissing – Touch with the lips, usually to express love, affection or greeting
- Love letter – Expression of love in written form
- Dating – Meeting socially intending a future relationship
- Couple – Physical or emotional intimacy

Scholarly publications

- Journal of Popular Romance Studies
