= Gibney =

Gibney may refer to:

== People ==
- Alex Gibney (born 1953), American film director and producer; son of Frank Gibney
- Bruce Gibney (born 1976), American writer and venture capitalist
- Claude Gibney Finch-Davies (1875–1920), British soldier, ornithologist and painter
- Chantal Gibney (born 1980), Irish swimmer
- Edmond Gibney (born 1974), Irish Olympic Three Day Eventing rider
- Elizabeth Gibney, physics reporter
- Frank Gibney (1924–2006), American journalist, editor, writer and scholar; father of Alex Gibney
- George Gibney, swimming coach and convicted child rapist
- Hal Gibney (1911–1973), American radio and television announcer
- James Gibney (1847–1908), Irish politician
- Jennifer Gibney (born 1964), Irish actress
- John A. Gibney Jr. (born 1951), American judge
- Matthew Gibney (1835–1925), Irish-born Australian bishop
- May Gibney (1893–1984), Irish nationalist and republican
- Patricia Gibney, Irish author
- Rebecca Gibney (born 1964), New Zealand-born, Australia-based actress
- Sheridan Gibney (1903–1988), American writer and producer
- Susan Gibney (born 1961), American actress
- Tom Gibney (1936–2021), Canadian television anchor
- Tom Gibney (footballer) (1887–1973), Australian rules footballer

== Fictional characters ==
- Holly Gibney, character in several novels by Stephen King
- Kyle Gibney, real name of Wild Child in the Marvel Comic publications

== Places ==
- Gibney Beach, beach on St John Island in the United States Virgin Islands
- Gibney Reef, reef in the Windmill Islands, Antarctica
