= Promise =

Commitment to do or not do something

A promise is a commitment by someone to do or not do something. As a noun promise means a declaration assuring that one will or will not do something. As a verb it means to commit oneself by a promise to do or give. It can also mean a capacity for good, similar to a value that is to be realized in the near future.

In the law of contract, an exchange of promises is usually held to be legally enforceable, according to the Latin maxim pacta sunt servanda.

== Types ==
There are many types of promises. There are solemn promises, such as marriage vows or military oaths and are conventions. There are legal contracts, enforceable by law. Or, there are fairy tale promises, regrettable and problematic at the time, they must be honored. And lastly, there are election promises, commitments that most people realize will later be shaped by politics and compromise.

Both an oath and an affirmation can be a promise. One special kind of promise is the vow.

A notable type of promise is an election promise. Election promises are pledges that will be later shaped by politics and the cooperation of individuals.

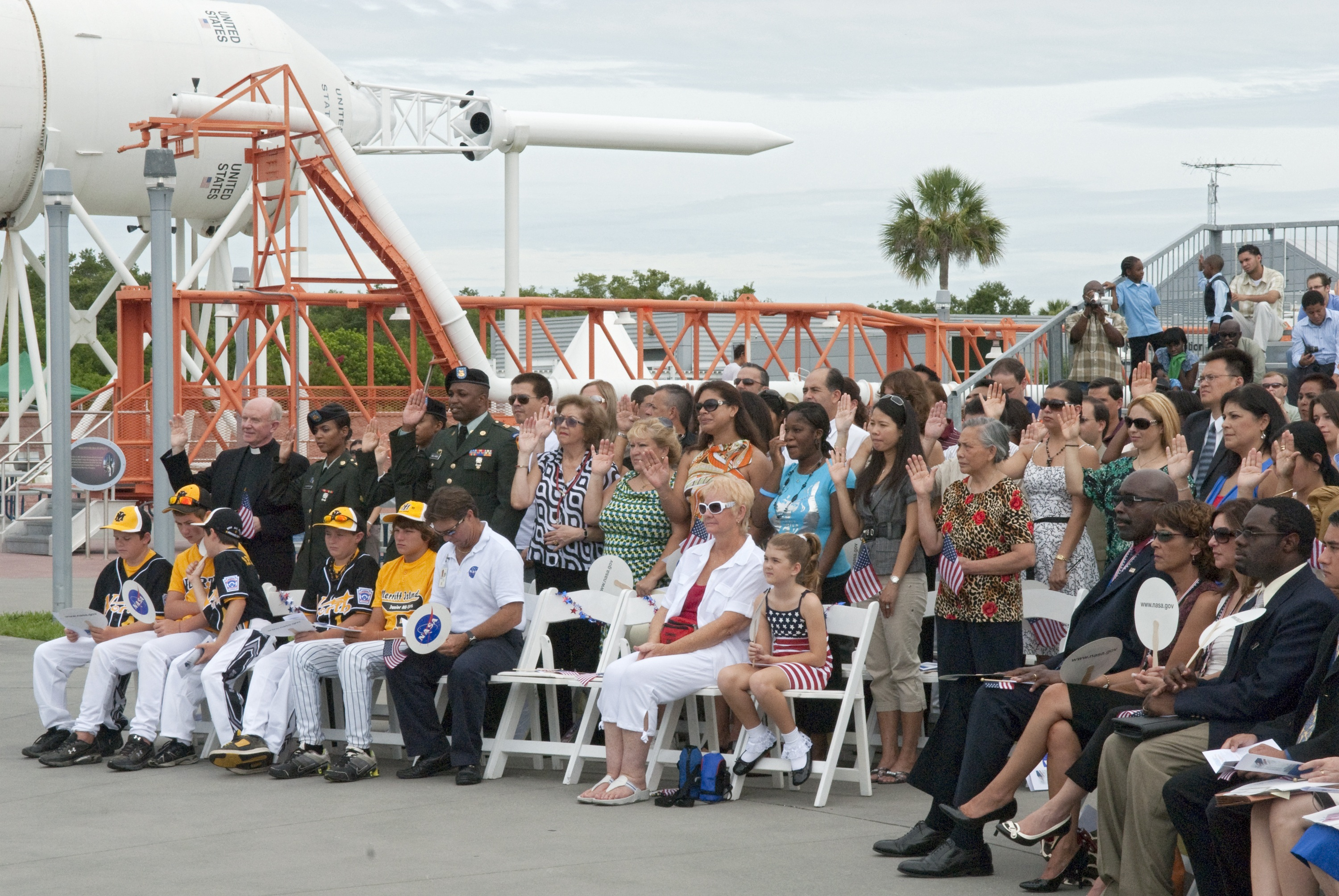
American immigrants seen swearing the Oath of Allegiance in 2010

A promise is a manifestation of intent to act or refrain from acting in a specified way at some point in the future. It's communicated by one party, to at least one additional party, to signify a commitment has been made. The person manifesting intent is the Promisor. The person to whom the manifestation is addressed is the Promisee.

In law, contracts are created by a process of offer and acceptance. An offer to enter into a binding contract consists of an indication by the Oferror to be legally bound by the terms indicated in the offer once the person to whom the offer is addressed, the Offeree, has accepted the offer in the manner indicated in the offer (if any). Once acceptance has taken place, a binding contract has come into existence and both parties are legally bound by its terms. A contract is therefore a voluntarily assumed legal obligation. A party who fails to perform his obligations under the contract is said to be in breach of contract and is liable to compensate the other party. Compensation normally takes the form of payment of a sum of money sufficient to place the party entitled to damages in the same position as in which that party would have been if the contract had been performed. For instance, if A agrees to sell a car to B for $10,000 and B agrees to pay, then if A fails to deliver the car, B would be entitled to compensation sufficient to enable B to purchase a similar car without having to spend more than the agreed price. Therefore, if by the time of the breach the price of the car has increased by 10%, A would be liable to pay B $1,000, assuming that B has not paid anything yet. If B has paid a deposit of $5,000, then B would be entitled to restitution of his deposit plus the $1,000. A contract may consist of mutual undertakings, as in the example just given, where A agreed to deliver a car and B agrees to pay for it. Such contracts are known as bilateral contracts. But a contract may only give rise to an undertaking by one party, as where A agrees to pay B if B finds a particular car which A has been trying to acquire. B is under no duty to search but would be entitled to payment if she finds the car.

Other types of promises would include solemn promises which includes marriage vows and military oaths. People also make fairy tale promises which are regrettable and difficult at the time the promise is made but must still be honored.

== Religion ==
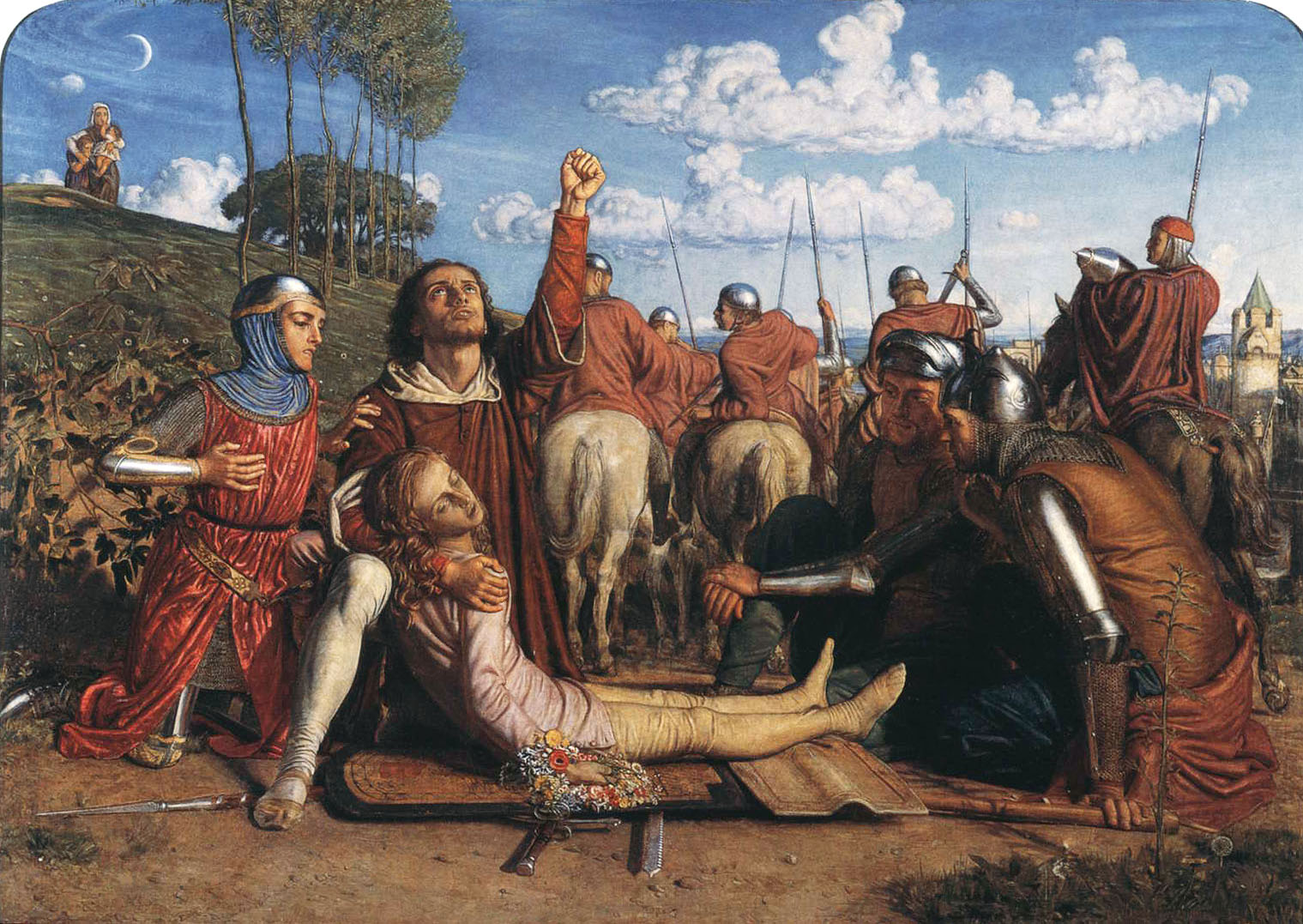
A painting depicting Cola di Rienzo as vowing to obtain justice

Christian theology regards the gift of the Holy Spirit bestowed on believers as the fulfillment of a promise made by Jesus. Jesus is seen as making "great promises" in favour of prayer. In Christian ethics, a distinction is made between simple promises and oaths or vows. An oath is a promise invoking God as a witness. A vow is a solemn form of a promise typically made to commit oneself to a moral good with God as witness, and binds oneself to its fulfillment over time. Some groups of Christians, for example the Religious Society of Friends and the Anabaptist Churches (such as the Mennonites), object to the taking of both oaths and affirmations, basing their objections upon a commandment given in the Sermon on the Mount, and regard all promises to be witnessed by God.

In Surah An-Nahl, God forbids Muslims to break their promises after they have confirmed them. All promises are regarded as having Allah as their witness and guarantor. In the hadith, Muhammad states that a Muslim who made a promise and then saw a better thing to do, should do the better thing and then make an act of atonement for breaking the promise. It is forbidden to break an oath in Islam. However, when someone does break an oath, they are required to ask for forgiveness and make up for the sin by feeding/clothing 10 poor people or freeing a slave (which is nearly impossible today), or, if unable to do these, to fast for three days. One of the four types of promises that are punished quickly is when you want to harm a relationship when the other person wants to keep it.

== Philosophy ==
Philosophers have tried to establish rules for promises. Immanuel Kant suggested promises should always be kept, while some consequentialists argue that promises should be broken whenever doing so would yield benefits. In How to Make Good Decisions and Be Right All the Time, Iain King tried to reconcile these positions, suggesting that promises should be kept 'unless they are worth less to others than a new option is to you,' and that this requires a relevant, unforeseen and reasonably unforeseeable change in the situation more important than the promise itself arising after the promise is made.

As opposed to Kant, some Rossian pluralists believe that morality with regards to right and wrong cannot be formalized in writing. In certain circumstances, breaking one's promise may be more beneficial than the cost of keeping it. These moral principles need guidance and good judgments to maximize the benefits of people involved.

== Politics ==
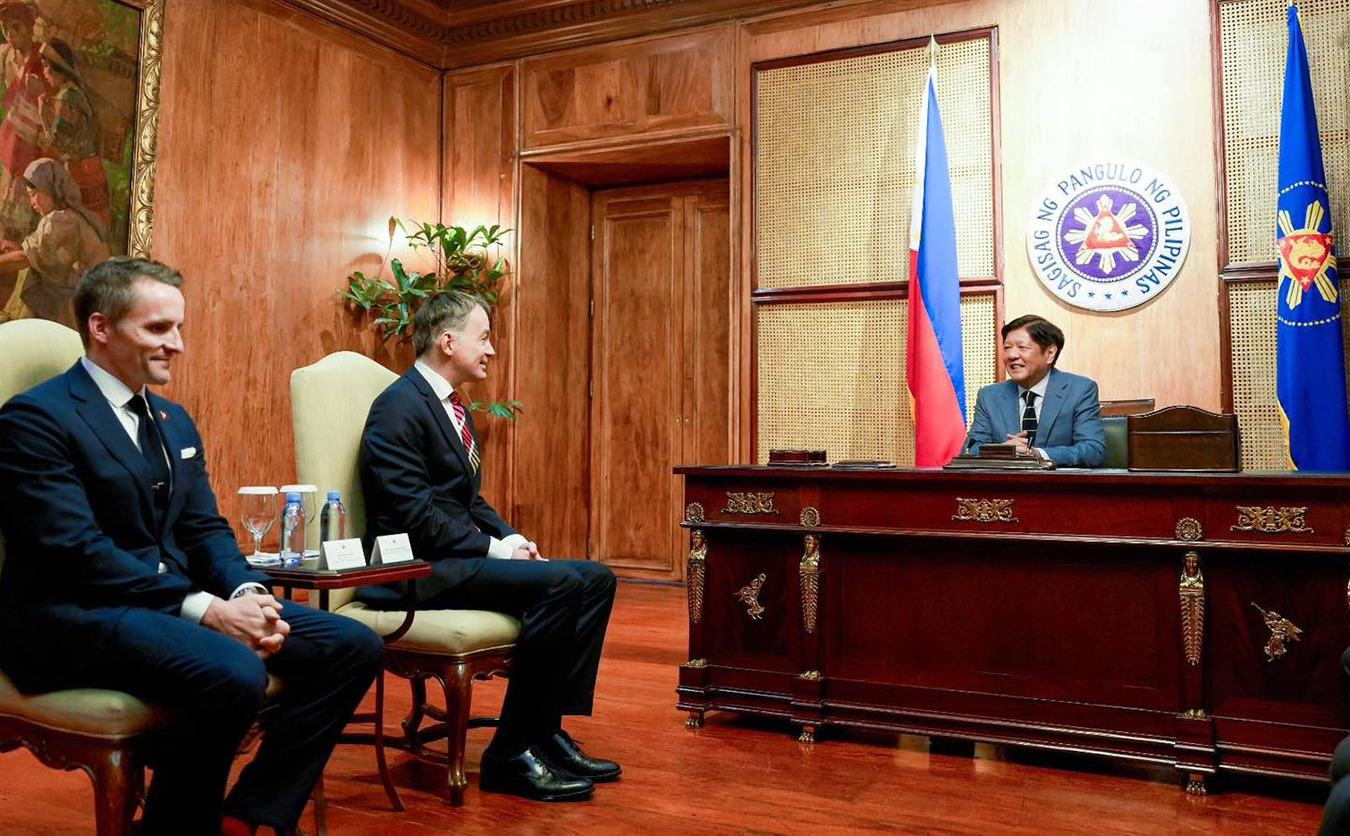
Diplomats from Switzerland making promises at a meeting in the Philippines

In democracy promises are made to offer assurance, especially during election. Political tactic to offer promise that would guarantee a better future to sway voters. In Western democracies, election promises are more often fulfilled than not. However, certain promises are broken.

== Society ==
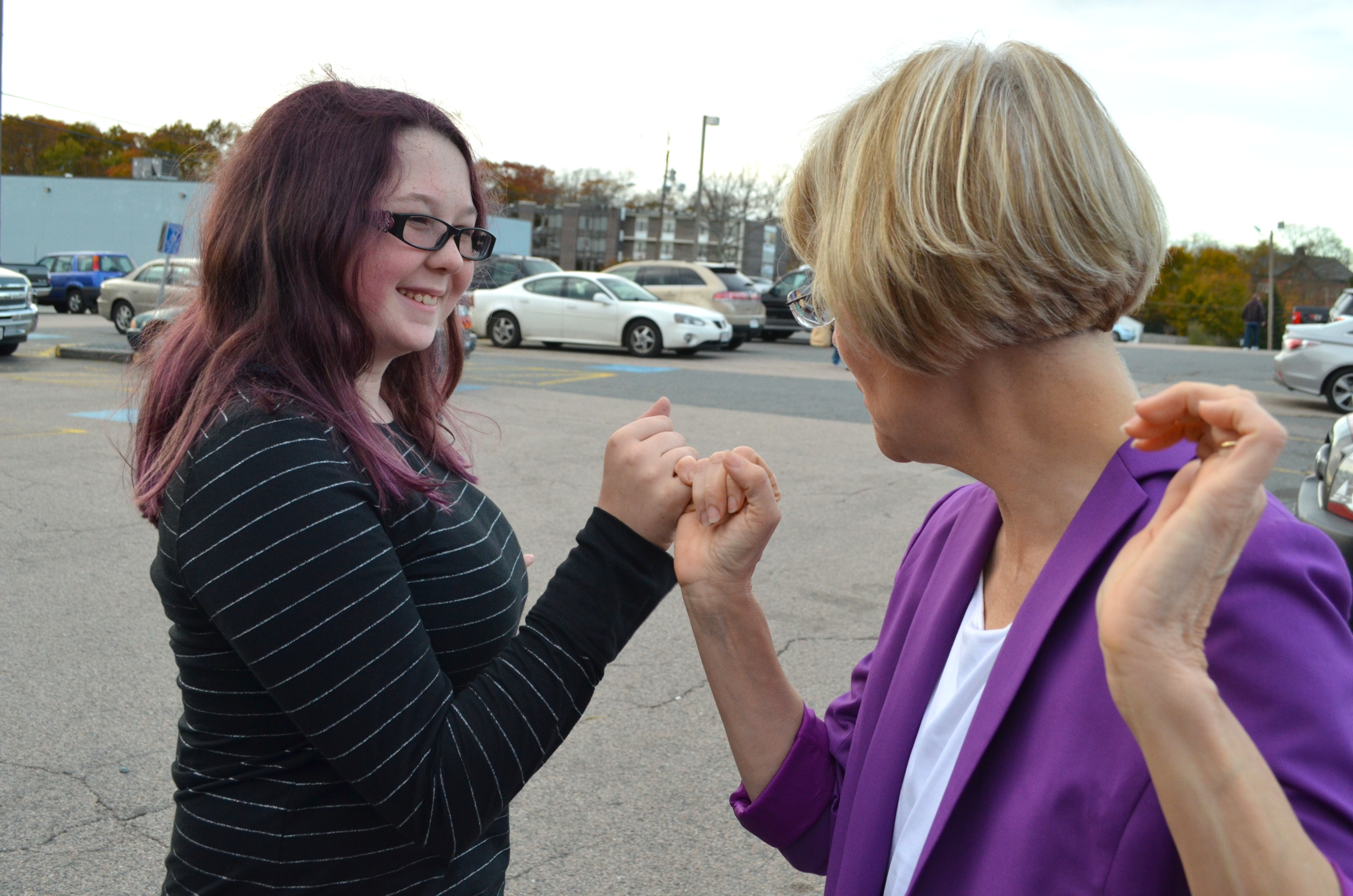
Linking little fingers is one of several common gestures indicating a promise has been made.

The "promise", in sociology and society, as discussed by C. Wright Mills and others is the ideological impression or commitment our society makes to us, and the commitment we make to our society in return for prosperity. The best or most popular example of this is the American Dream.

== Psychology ==
Promises are compared with threats by Verbrugge, Dieussaert, Schaeken and William. When a threat or promise is conditional, it tends to receive biconditional interpretation. Also, both threats and promises are highly controlled by the speaker. The fundamental difference is the valence of the prospective action on the speaker's part. In the case of a promise it is generally positive while in the case of a threat it is negative. There is some evidence to suggest that threats are perceived simply as negative promises. However, promises are often made with an intent on the speaker's part to convince a hearer to do something by holding out the prospect of a reward; threats by contrasts are often made with an intent to influence a hearer's behavior by holding out the prospect of a punishment. In addition, certain characteristics of promises and threats, such as "magnitude" and "credibility", affect the probability that the target will gain compliance or failure. Promises can fall under many different categories, however they will have two key components. The type of activity that the promises undertakes to do, and the content of the promise. Promises can give us both the security that something is being fully guaranteed and the stress that you are guaranteeing something that cannot be verified at that given moment. This can create both a positive and a negative effect on our minds.

== See also ==
- Asmachta
- Committed relationship
- Contract law
- Credibility
- Cheap talk
- Documentality
