= Ruth Frances Long =

Irish fantasy and romance writer

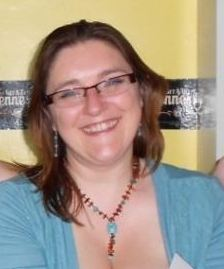
- Born: April 20, 1971; Dublin, Ireland
- Occupation: Writer
- Writing career
- Pen name: R.F. Long; Ruth Frances Long; Jessica Thorne
- Genres: romance, fantasy, young adult, paranormal romance
- Website: rflong.com

Ruth Frances Long, also known as R.F. Long and Jessica Thorne, (20 April 1971) is an Irish author who writes in the fantasy and romance genres. Her novel, The Stone's Heart by Jessica Thorne, was nominated for the Romantic Novelists' Association Fantasy Romantic Novel award. The latest series is The Feral Gods as Ruth Frances Long, which begins with The Book of Gold from Hodderscape. This novel was on the 2024 Locus Recommended reading list. The sequel, The Lore of Silver, was released in 2025. The conclusion, The God of Bronze, comes out on November 20, 2026.

== Biography ==
Ruth Long is a Dublin-born writer of fantasy novels, novellas and short stories, both for adults and young adults. She completed a M.A. in English Literature and also studied History of Religions and Celtic Civilisation. Long has always been interested in fantasy, romance and ancient mysteries. Along with writing, she is a librarian working initially in the County Dublin library system. Long is now head librarian for a private specialized library of rare and unusual books. She currently lives in Wicklow.

Long originally wrote novels and novellas as R.F. Long. The Scroll Thief, Soul Fire, The Wolf's Sister, The Wolf's Mate & The Wolf's Destiny were republished in 2019.

Her first novel as Ruth Frances Long was The Treachery of Beautiful Things in 2012, a 10th anniversary edition was released in 2022. She then released The Dubh Linn trilogy beginning with A Crack in Everything, which was published each year beginning in 2014.

Long signed with digital publisher Bookouture for the publication of fantasy novels, beginning with The Queen's Wing series written under the pen name Jessica Thorne.The Stone's Heart was nominated for the Romantic Novelists' Association Romantic Fantasy novel of the year.

In October 2025, she was a guest on Off the Shelf as part of the Bournemouth Writers Festival.

In January 2026, Second Sky published her stand-alone novel Wildewood, which reviewer Sharon Rimmelzwaan described as "A gothic fantasy romance with a dash of the supernatural".

=== Awards and honors ===
- In 2015, on the publication of her second novel for Young Adults A Crack in Everything, Long won the Spirit of Dedication Award for 'Best Creator of Children's Science Fiction and Fantasy' from the European Science Fiction Society (ESFS), announced at the 37th Annual European Science Fiction Convention (Eurocon 2015) in St. Petersburg, Russia.

Work	Year & Award	Category	Result	Ref.
—N/a	2015 ESFS Spirit of Dedication Award	Best creator of children's ScienceFiction or fantasy books	Won	
The Stone's Heart	2020 Romantic Novelists' Association Award	Fantasy Romantic Novel	Nominated	
The Book of Gold	2025 BSFA Award	Novel	Longlisted	
The Book of Gold	2024 Locus Recommended Reading List	Novels - Fantasy	Selected	
—N/a	2026 ESFS Hall of Fame Award	Best Author	Nominated	

== Bibliography ==
=== As R.F. Long ===
==== Short fiction ====
- Elements in Flashing Swords' Summer Special (2008)
- Carrying Keptara in the Hadley Rille Books Anthology Ruins Metropolis (2008)
- The Wrecker's Daughter in Ocean Magazine (Fall 2008)

==== The Holtlands ====
- The Wolf's Sister (2008)
- The Wolf's Mate (2009)
- The Wolf's Destiny (2011)

==== Stand-alone novels ====
- The Scroll Thief (2009)
- Soul Fire (2010)
- Songs of the Wolf: Tales of the Holtlands (2010) (collection of the novellas The Wolf's Sister and The Wolf's Mate)

=== As Ruth Frances Long ===
==== Dubh Linn ====
- A Crack in Everything (2014)
- A Hollow in the Hills (2015)
- A Darkness at the End (2016)

==== The Feral Gods ====
- The Book of Gold (Hodderscape, 2024)
- The Lore of Silver (Hodderscape, 2025)
- The God of Bronze (Hodderscape, forthcoming, November 2026)

==== Stand-alone novels ====
- The Treachery of Beautiful Things (2012)

=== As Jessica Thorne ===
==== The Queen's Wing ====
- The Queen's Wing (November 2018)
- The Stone's Heart (February 2019)

==== The Hollow King ====
- Mageborn (February 2020)
- Nightborn (May 2020)

==== The Lost Queen ====
- A Touch of Shadows (September 2024)
- A Kiss of Flame (September 2024)
- A Crown of Darkness (October 2024)

==== Stand-alone novels ====
- The Lost Girls of Foxfield Hall (March 2021)
- The Bookbinder's Daughter (September 2021)
- The Water Witch (August 2022)
- The Rise of Adscendo (June 2023)
- Wildewood (January 2026)
