= Peace at Any Price =

Book about the UN temporary governance of Kosovo

Peace at Any Price: How the World Failed Kosovo
- Authors: Iain King and Whit Mason
- Language: English
- Subject: International
- Published: 2006 (Cornell University Press)
- Publication place: United States and United Kingdom
- Media type: Hardcover
- Pages: 328
- ISBN: 978-0-8014-4539-2

Peace at Any Price: How the World Failed Kosovo is a 2006 book by Iain King and Whit Mason. It chronicles the history of Kosovo, focusing on the period from 1999 to 2005, when Kosovo was governed by and under the authority of the United Nations.

The book explains this history with sections on Kosovo's security and the rule of law; inter-ethnic relations; political developments; hearts, minds and culture; and economy. It draws on Kai Eide's Report of 2005, which criticized the international community's performance in Kosovo, and was approved unanimously by the United Nations Security Council.

The book has 226 citations in other published works, and features in university reading lists on politics, conflict studies and international relations.

The book concludes that:

“The international community was very successful where there was a strong and unified international will to tackle a straightforward physical task, such as the humanitarian crisis of 1999… Where the international protectorate almost completely failed was in changing the way people thought and behaved... After six years of unprecedented international support, Kosovo remained a place where the strong bullied the weak and where there remained an extraordinary lack of public spirit. This is less than Western democracies hoped for when they intervened to stop barbarities in 1999, and much less than most of the thousands of foreigners and Kosovans believed they were working towards between 1999 and 2005.”

It attributes this poor performance to six mistakes made by the international community:

- Failure to understand Kosovo's history and culture;
- Deep reluctance to assert control over the means by which public attitudes were shaped;
- Incoherence in the mandate for the international mission, UNSCR 1244;
- Flaws in the way the international civilian organizations tasked with governing Kosovo were structured;
- Failures of political will, which meant lingering problems, such inadequate enforcement of the law, were allowed to fester; and
- Failures of time and patience, ‘a lack of political stamina… the classic misfit of short-term solutions to long-term problems.’;

The book concludes with ten lessons for future interventions.
