= Angela Marsons =

British crime fiction author

Angela Marsons (b 1968) is a British author of crime fiction, from the Black Country in the West Midlands. She has sold more than three-and-a-half million copies of her novels, which have been translated into 28 languages.

== Writing career ==
Angela Marsons is from Brierley Hill in the West Midlands and is a former security guard at the Merry Hill Shopping Centre. Having been rejected by numerous publishers over 25 years, she released three books in her crime series in 2015 under digital publisher Bookouture. Her books all have a Black Country setting, but the author says "I never write about a set group of people or anyone particular I know, all my characters are make believe." The principal character in the crime series is Detective Kim Stone. The success of the digitally-published Kim Stone books resulted in a print deal with publisher Bonnier Publishing Fiction. Marsons is signed to Bookouture for a total of 16 books in the Kim Stone series. In 2020, Marsons signed a deal with Bookoture for an extra 12 books in the Kim Stone series, bringing the total to 28. In May 2025 the deal with Bookoture was extended to 36 tiltes through to 2032.

== Bibliography ==
=== Kim Stone novels ===
1. Silent Scream - 20 February 2015, ISBN 978-1785770524
2. Evil Games - 29 May 2015, ISBN 978-1785762147
3. Lost Girls - 6 November 2015, ISBN 978-1785762178
4. Play Dead - 20 May 2016, ISBN 978-0751571332
5. Blood Lines - 4 November 2016, ISBN 978-0751571349
6. Dead Souls - 28 April 2017, ISBN 978-0751571356
7. Broken Bones - 3 November 2017, ISBN 978-0751574890
8. Dying Truth - 18 May 2018, ISBN 978-1786814753
9. Fatal Promise - 19 October 2018, ISBN 978-1786816931
10. Dead Memories - 22 February 2019, ISBN 978-1786817723
11. Child's Play - 11 July 2019, ISBN 978-1786815699
12. First Blood - 14 November 2019, ISBN 978-0751579826
13. Killing Mind - 13 May 2020, ISBN 978-1838887315
14. Deadly Cry - 13 November 2020, ISBN 978-1838887339
15. Twisted Lies - 10 May 2021, ISBN 1838887342
16. Stolen Ones - 11 November 2021, ISBN 9781838887360
17. Six Graves - 2 May 2022, ISBN 1838887385
18. Hidden Scars - 9 November 2022, ISBN 1803147717
19. Deadly Fate - 25 May 2023, ISBN 1837903980
20. Bad Blood - 15 November 2023, ISBN 9781837906741
21. 36 hours - 10 December 2024, ISBN 9781835259887
22. Little Children - 12 August 2025, ISBN 9781836186540
23. Wicked Women - 14 April 2026, ISBN 9781805502265

=== Other works ===
- Dear Mother - 1 February 2014, ISBN 978-1786810427
- The Forgotten Woman - 12 October 2016, ISBN 978-1786810441
