= Asmachta =

In Jewish law, an asmachta (Hebrew: אסמכתא, also asmakhta), is a conditional commitment or promise that a person makes, but actually has no intention of keeping. The agreement is not considered binding, and the commitment is considered null and void.

Controversy exists as to whether various forms of gambling, including games of chance and lottery tickets, are considered to be an asmachta.

== Examples ==
1. In Baba Batra: "Mashlish et Shitaro" Let's say Kenny owes Simon $1000. Kenny pays Simon half of that, $500, and tells him that he will pay him the other $500 at a later time. Kenny must also give a document of "I.O.U." to a third party, let's say Erica. This document says that he will pay the other half, $500. by a certain time. If he does not pay the amount, this case can be taken to court, and Kenny has to pay Simon the full $1000 over again.
2. In Baba Metziah: "Im oveer v'lo ashalem alpha zuzey" This is talking about a person who is counting on not having to pay a sum to the person he owes it to. If Kenny says he will pay money to Simon if he does not do the work Simon assigns to him. But Kenny does not really want to commit to paying money to Simon, so he is committing to something he does not want to do.
3. Shach (C.M. 129:6) rules that one who merely declares, "I guarantee the loan for whoever lends money to Ploni" is not responsible for the loan. Since the guarantor did not specify the lender, he did not assign him as his agent to lend: the commitment is considered an asmachta
