= Kathryn Croft =

British author

Kathryn Croft is a British author of psychological thriller fiction. She sold one million novels within a year of publishing her third crime thriller.

== Writing career ==
Croft is originally from Watford but grew up in Guildford. She was a secondary school teacher after gaining an MA in Media Arts with English Literature. She gave up teaching to focus on writing full-time. Her third novel – The Girl With No Past reached number 1 and stayed for over four weeks, in the Amazon Kindle chart.

== Bibliography ==
- Behind Closed Doors - (Published by CreateSpace Independent Publishing Platform, December 2013, ISBN 978-1500120955)
- The Stranger Within - (Published by CreateSpace Independent Publishing Platform, October 2014, ISBN 978-1502879905)
- The Girl With No Past - (Published by Bookouture, October 2015, ISBN 978-1910751244)
- The Girl You Lost - (Published by Bookouture, February 2016, ISBN 978-1910751718)
- While You Were Sleeping - (Published by Bookouture, November 2016, ISBN 978-1786810953)
- Silent Lies - (Published by Bookouture, October 2017, ISBN 978-1786812841)
- The Warning - (Published by Bookouture, October 2018, ISBN 978-0751576122)
- The Other Husband - (Published by Canelo, October 2021, ISBN 978-1800325197)
- The Lying Wife - (Published by Canelo, February 2022), ISBN 978-1800327405)
- The Mother's Secret - (Published by Canelo, May 2022), ISBN 978-1800325210)
- The Neighbour Upstairs - (Published by Canelo, October 2022), ISBN 978-1800327429)
- The Suspect - (Published by Bookouture, February 2023), ISBN 978-1803148618)
- The Lie - (Published by Bookouture, April 2023), ISBN 978-1837901111)
- The Wedding Guest - (Published by Bookouture, September 2023), ISBN 978-1837906857)
- The Girl in Room 12 - (Published by Bookouture, January 2024), ISBN 978-1837909827)
