= Bookouture =

British digital publishing company

- Parent company: Hachette Livre
- Status: Active
- Founded: 2012
- Founder: Oliver Rhodes
- Country of origin: United Kingdom
- Headquarters location: London
- Official website: www.bookouture.com

Bookouture is a British digital publishing company. It was founded in 2012 by Oliver Rhodes, a former marketing controller for Harlequin/Mills & Boon. Bookouture is notable for growing its e-book sales dramatically, and for having several of its publications sell substantial numbers.

Bookouture made its first big successes in 2015, when it sold 2.5 million books, including Silent Scream by Angela Marsons, a crime novel featuring detective Kim Stone, and the thriller Secrets of The Last Nazi by Iain King. These were followed in 2016 by Robert Bryndza's The Girl in the Ice, its first book to sell a million copies. In 2017, it was acquired by Hachette, and in 2019 it sold 9 million books more than half of them in the United States.

In 2020, Bookouture launched the imprint Thread Books, with an initial group of five non-fiction books.

In 2023, Bookouture launched a SF and fantasy imprint, Second Sky.

Author Kerry Wilkinson has produced "the most titles Bookouture has ever released from one author", which was at 30 in 2021.

Meanwhile, Angela Marsons' Kim Stone series, all of which has been published through Bookouture, has sold 5.5m copies, with BBC Studios optioning the first 20 books in the series.

The company's highest-ever earning title is Freida McFadden's The Housemaid’s Secret, which was published in February 2023. As of September 2023, the book had sold 1.8m copies.

== Bestselling authors ==
- Angela Marsons
- Carla Kovach
- Freida McFadden
- Jenny Hale
- Julia Crouch
- K.L. Slater
- Kathryn Croft
- Kerry Fisher
- Kerry Wilkinson
- K. L. Slater
- Leah Mercer
- Lisa Regan
- Patricia Gibney
- Robert Bryndza
- Shalini Boland
- Suzanne Goldring
