= Secrets of The Last Nazi =

Debut novel by non-fiction writer Iain King

- Cover of the first edition
- Author: Iain King
- Language: English
- Genre: Thriller
- Publisher: Bookouture
- Publication date: 2015
- Publication place: United Kingdom
- Media type: Paperback and E-book
- ISBN: 9781910751107

Secrets of The Last Nazi is the debut novel by non-fiction writer Iain King. It became the United Kingdom’s best-selling spy story of 2015, and was classified in the United States as a ‘Number One New Release’ in espionage.

The story follows an international team of five, led by eccentric British military historian Myles Munro, which investigates the life and secrets of SS Captain Werner Stolz, while facing several dangers.

The book received mixed reviews.

A prequel, Last Prophecy of Rome which also featured the character Myles Munro, was published in 2016.
