= Patricia Gibney =

Irish crime fiction author

Patricia Gibney is an Irish author of crime fiction who sold 100,000 copies of her first crime thriller as an e-book, and had total sales exceeding 500,000 copies in 2018. By 2019, total book sales had passed one million.

== Early life ==
Gibney is from Mullingar, County Westmeath and has lived there all her life. She spent 30 years working with Westmeath County Council.

== Writing career ==
When her husband died in 2009, aged 49, three months after a diagnosis of cancer, Gibney turned to art and writing, self-publishing a children's book entitled Spring Sprong Sally. Gibney then started writing crime fiction and created her first novel in that genre. She worked with the Irish Writers Centre to improve her writing. Eventually she began a second novel and through that acquired an agent and a publishing contract with Bookouture, which has since been bought by Hachette Publishing.

=== Lottie Parker detective novels ===
Gibney's thirteen novels to date feature a main character, Detective Inspector Lottie Parker. The novels are set in the fictional Irish town of Ragmullin, which is an anagram of the real-life town of Mullingar, where Gibney lives.

== Bibliography ==
- Spring Sprong Sally: In Her Spring Sprong World, October 2011, ISBN 978-0957003507

Detective Lottie Parker Books, 1-11:

1. The Missing Ones, Published by Bookouture, March 2017, ISBN 978-1786811509
2. The Stolen Girls, Published by Bookouture, July 2017, ISBN 978-0751572193
3. The Lost Child, Published by Bookouture, October 2017, ISBN 978-0751572483
4. No Safe Place, Published by Bookouture, March 2018, ISBN 978-0751574913
5. Tell Nobody, Published by Bookouture, October 2018, ISBN 978-0751577525
6. Final Betrayal, Published by Bookouture, April 2019, ISBN 978-1786818492
7. Broken Souls, Published by Bookouture, October 2019, ISBN 978-1838880804
8. Buried Angels, Published by Bookouture, May 2020, ISBN 978-1838886622
9. Silent Voices, Published by Bookouture, February 2021, ISBN 978-1800190818
10. Little Bones, Published by Bookouture, September 2021, ISBN 978-1800196179
11. The Guilty Girl, Published by Bookouture, June 2022, ISBN 978-1803142524
12. Three Widows
13. The Altar Girls
14. Her Last Walk Home
15. Hidden Daughters
