= De amore (Andreas Capellanus) =

Treatise by Andrea Cappellano

De amore ("On Love") is a twelfth-century treatise in Medieval Latin, written by Andreas Capellanus. The work is also known as De arte honeste amandi, for which a possible English translation is The Skill of Loving Virtuously. The real identity of Capellanus has never been determined, but has been a matter of extended academic debate. He is sometimes known by a French translation of his name, André le Chapelain.

== Background ==
De Amore was written sometime between 1186 and 1190. Its structure and content borrow heavily from Ovid's Ars amatoria. It was most likely intended for the French court of Philip Augustus. It has been supposed to have been written in 1185 at the request of Marie de Champagne, daughter of King Louis VII of France and of Eleanor of Aquitaine. A dismissive allusion in the text to the "wealth of Hungary" has suggested the hypothesis that it was written after 1184, at the time when Bela III of Hungary had sent to the French court a statement of his income and had proposed marriage to Marie's sister Marguerite of France, but before 1186, when his proposal was accepted.

John Jay Parry, who edited De Amore, has described it as "one of those capital works which reflect the thought of a great epoch, which explains the secret of a civilization." It may be viewed as didactic, mocking, or merely descriptive; in any event it preserves the attitudes and practices that were the foundation of a long and significant tradition in Western literature.

The social system of "courtly love", as gradually elaborated by the Provençal troubadours from the mid twelfth-century, soon spread. It is often associated with Eleanor of Aquitaine (herself the granddaughter of an early troubadour poet, William IX of Aquitaine), but this link has never been verified. It has been proposed that De Amore codifies the social and sexual life of Eleanor's court at Poitiers between 1169 and 1174 because the author mentions both Eleanor and her daughter Marie by name; but there is no evidence that Marie ever saw her mother again after Eleanor's divorce from Louis VII in 1152.

== Outline of De Amore ==
The work deals with several specific themes that were the subject of poetical debate among late twelfth century troubadours and trobairitz. The basic conception of Capellanus is that courtly love ennobles both the lover and the beloved, provided that certain codes of behaviour are respected. De amore describes the affection between spouses as an unrelated emotion, stating that "love can have no place between husband and wife," although they may feel even "immoderate affection" for one another. Rather, the most ennobling love is generally secret and extremely difficult to obtain, serving as a means for inspiring men to great deeds.

Preface: De Amore begins with a preface (præfatio), in which Andreas addresses an unidentified young man named Walter. Though Capellanus' relationship with the young man is unclear, he describes Walter as "a new soldier of love, wounded with a new arrow," not knowing "how aptly to govern the reins of the horse that soldier himself rides nor to be able to find any remedy [him]self." Capellanus promises to teach Walter, with this book, “the way in which a state of love between two lovers may be kept unharmed, and likewise how those who do not love may get rid of the darts of Venus that are in their hearts.” Whether literal or ironic, Capellanus implies here that he intends to teach the ways of love to his eager disciple.

Book I: After an introductory analysis of "What love is" (Parry, pp. 28–36), Book One of De Amore sets out a series of nine imaginary dialogues (pp. 36–141) between men and women of different social classes, from bourgeoisie to royalty. In each dialogue the man is pleading inconclusively to be accepted as the woman's lover, and in each he finds some small reason for optimism. The dialogs are delightful compositions, with many well-crafted arguments (albeit based on medieval rather than modern concepts) by both the ardent suitor and the skeptical lady; typically, the older man asks to be rewarded for his accomplishments whereas the young men or men of lower birth ask to be given inspiration so that they might accomplish something. These dialogues are followed by short discussions of love with priests, with nuns, for money, with peasant women, and with prostitutes (pp. 141–150).

Book II: This book takes love as established, and begins with a discussion of how love is maintained and how and why it comes to an end (pp. 151–167). Following this comes a series of twenty-one "judgements of love" (pp. 167–177), said to have been pronounced in contentious cases by great ladies. Among these, three judgements are attributed to "Queen Eleanor" and another four simply to "the Queen", seven to Eleanor's daughter Marie of Troyes ("the Countess of Champagne"), two to Eleanor's niece Isabelle of Vermandois ("the Countess of Flanders", daughter of Petronilla of Aquitaine), one to "a court of ladies in Gascony", and five to Viscountess Ermengarde of Narbonne, who is thus singled out as the only patron of a "Court of Love" not belonging to the immediate family of Eleanor of Aquitaine. However, it has been suggested that "the Queen" is not Eleanor but Adèle of Champagne, Eleanor's successor as wife of Louis VII and Queen of France. Book Two concludes (pp. 177–186) by setting out "The Rules of Love". A few examples of these guidelines are listed below (numbered according to the order found in the original work, which contains thirty-one total):

1. Marriage is no real excuse for not loving.
6. Boys do not love until they arrive at the age of maturity.
8. No one should be deprived of love without the very best of reasons.
13. When made public love rarely endures.
14. The easy attainment of love makes it of little value; difficulty of attainment makes it prized.
20. A man in love is always apprehensive.
30. A true lover is constantly and without intermission possessed by the thought of his beloved.

Book III: This book is the briefest (pp. 187–212), and is titled "The Rejection of Love". This book seeks to remedy the natural affection of men for women, by painting all women as disgusting as possible in so few words. For example, women are described as being completely untrustworthy ("everything a woman says is said with the intention of deceiving"), insanely greedy and willing to do anything for food, weak-minded and easily swayed by false reasoning, "slanderers filled with envy and hate," drunkards, loud-mouthed and gossipy, unfaithful in love, disobedient, vain and tortured by envy of all other women's beauty, "even her daughter's." The historical example of Eve is cited at several points as evidence. This book is a disclaimer for the rest of the work—as is evidenced by its heading. It includes reasons why love affairs of the sort found in this book should not be conducted, and that personal abstinence from love was the preferred route. Capellanus states that this abstinence would allow one to “win an eternal recompense and thereby deserve a greater reward from God.” This last book constitutes one reason not to take the bulk of Capellanus' work at face value. Though some social practices acceptable during the Middle Ages may be reflected in Capellanus' work, it cannot be clearly demonstrated to be a reliable source on the common medieval attitude to "courtly love."

=== Sidelights ===
De Amore gives a listing of the stages of love, which resembles in some ways the modern baseball euphemism:

"Throughout all the ages, there have been only four degrees [gradus] in love:
"The first consists in arousing hope;
"The second in offering kisses;
"The third in the enjoyment of intimate embraces;
"The fourth in the abandonment of the entire person."

Courtly love is reserved for the middle and upper classes in De Amore. Attractive peasant girls are to be shunned or, failing this, "embraced by force":

"If you should, by some chance, fall in love with a peasant woman, be careful to puff her up with lots of praise and then, when you find a convenient opportunity, do not hold back but take your pleasure and embrace her by force. For you can hardly soften their outward inflexibility so far that they will grant you their embraces quietly or permit you to have the solaces you desire unless you first use a little compulsion as a convenient cure for their shyness. We do not say these things, however, because we want to persuade you to love such women, but only so that, if through lack of caution you should be driven to love them, you may know, in brief compass, what to do." (Parry, p. 150, adapted).

In a similar vein, Andreas describes nuns as easy to seduce, although he condemns anyone who does so as a "disgusting animal."

== Bibliography ==
- Capellanus, Andreas (1990). The Art of Courtly Love. Translated by Parry, John Jay. Columbia University Press. ISBN 978-0-231-07305-9.
- Capellanus, Andreas (2009). Andreas Capellanus on Love. Translated by Walsh, P. G. Bloomsbury Academic. ISBN 978-0-7156-1690-1.
- Andreas Capellanus: Andreae Capellani regii Francorum de amore libri tres. Reprint of the Latin edition by E. Trojel 1892, Munich 1972.
