= Tom Gibney (footballer) =

Australian rules footballer

Personal information
- Full name: Thomas Francis Gibney
- Born: 28 October 1886; Geelong, Victoria
- Died: 4 April 1973 (aged 86); Geelong, Victoria
- Original team: Barwon

Playing career^{1}
Years	Club	Games (Goals)
1906	Geelong	7 (5)
- ^{1} Playing statistics correct to the end of 1906.

Thomas Francis Gibney (28 October 1886 – 4 April 1973) was an Australian rules footballer who played with Geelong in the Victorian Football League (VFL).
