= Elizabeth Gibney =

Science journalist

Lizzie Gibney
- Born: Elizabeth Gibney
- Education: University of Cambridge (BA); Imperial College London (MSc)
- Employer(s): Nature; Times Higher Education; Research Fortnight
- Known for: Science Journalism
- Website: twitter.com/lizziegibney

Elizabeth Gibney is an English science journalist. She is senior physics reporter at Nature. She has written for Scientific American, BBC and CERN.

== Education ==
Gibney studied the Natural Sciences Tripos at the University of Cambridge. She completed a Master of Science (MSc) postgraduate degree in Science Communication at Imperial College London.

== Career ==
Gibney worked for Research Fortnight. Gibney worked in the communications team for the Compact Muon Solenoid (CMS) experiment at CERN. She has been described as "feminist science journalist". She worked at Times Higher Education between 2012 and 2013. She dubbed the excitement surrounding particle physics after detection of the Higgs boson as Higgsteria.

Gibney joined Nature in 2013 and is now senior physics reporter. Gibney produces 3-minute guides to new areas of research. In 2014, she won the Malofiej Medal for her infographics Landing on a comet. in 2015, she was highly commended at the Science Journalism Awards for her short video "Laniakea: Our home supercluster".

She has written for Scientific American, The Sunday Times, BBC News and the Department for Environment, Food and Rural Affairs (DEFRA).
