= Andreas Capellanus =

French author

Andreas Capellanus (Capellanus meaning "chaplain"), also known as Andrew the Chaplain (fl. c. 1185), and occasionally by a French translation of his name, André le Chapelain, was the 12th-century author of a treatise commonly known as De amore ("About Love"), and often known in English, somewhat misleadingly, as The Art of Courtly Love, though its realistic, somewhat cynical tone suggests that it is in some measure an antidote to courtly love. Little is known of Andreas Capellanus's life, but he is presumed to have been a courtier of Marie de Champagne, and probably of French origin.

== His work ==
De Amore was written at the request of Marie de Champagne, daughter of King Louis VII of France and of Eleanor of Aquitaine. In it, the author informs a young pupil, Walter, of the pitfalls of love. A dismissive allusion in the text to the "wealth of Hungary" has suggested the hypothesis that it was written after 1184, at the time when Bela III of Hungary had sent to the French court a statement of his income and had proposed marriage to Marie's half-sister Marguerite of France, but before 1186, when his proposal was accepted.

De Amore is made up of three books. The first book covers the etymology and definition of love and is written in the manner of an academic lecture. The second book consists of sample dialogues between members of different social classes; it outlines how the romantic process between the classes should work. This second work is largely considered to be an inferior to the first. Book three is made of stories from actual courts of love presided over by noble women.

John Jay Parry, the editor of one modern edition of De Amore, quotes critic Robert Bossuat as describing De Amore as "one of those capital works which reflect the thought of a great epoch, which explains the secret of a civilization". It may be viewed as didactic, mocking, or merely descriptive; in any event it preserves the attitudes and practices that were the foundation of a long and significant tradition in Western literature.

The social system of "courtly love", as gradually elaborated by the Provençal troubadours from the mid twelfth century, soon spread. One of the circles in which this poetry and its ethic were cultivated was the court of Eleanor of Aquitaine (herself the granddaughter of an early troubadour poet, William IX of Aquitaine). De Amore codifies the social and love life of Eleanor's court at Poitiers between 1170 and 1174, though it was evidently written at least ten years later and, apparently, at Troyes. It deals with several specific themes that were the subject of poetical debate among late twelfth century troubadours and trobairitz.

The meaning of De Amore has been debated over the centuries. In the years immediately following its release many people took Andreas' opinions concerning Courtly Love seriously. In more recent times, however, scholars have come to view the priest's work as satirical. Many scholars now agree that Andreas was commenting on the materialistic, superficial nature of medieval nobles. Andreas seems to have been warning young Walter, his protégé, about love in the Middle Ages.

== See also ==
- Martianus Capella
- Quadrivium

== Bibliography ==
- Andreas Capellanus: The Art of Courtly Love, trans. John Jay Parry. New York: Columbia University Press, 1941. (Reprinted: New York: Norton, 1969.)
- Andreas Capellanus: On Love, ed. and trans. P. G. Walsh. London: Duckworth, 1982.
