= Zhuchun yuan =

18th c. Chinese romance novel

Cover of the novel Zhuchun yuan, collection of the Fudan University

Zhuchun yuan (traditional Chinese: 駐春園; simplified Chinese: 驻春园), (Note: Also known in Chinese as Zhuchun yuan xiaoshi (traditional Chinese: 駐春園小史; simplified Chinese: 驻春园小史).) also translated into English as Dwelling in Spring Garden or The Garden of Spring Residence, is a Chinese caizi jiaren romance novel from the 18th century during the Qing dynasty. The novel was written by Wuhang Yeke (吳航野客), a writer under a pseudonym. The novel was published during the Qianlong period in 1783 and it consists of 24 chapters.

Another edition of the novel, collection of the Harvard University

The opening of the novel
