= How to Make Good Decisions and Be Right All the Time =

2008 English-language philosophy book by Iain King

- Cover of the first edition
- Author: Iain King
- Language: English
- Subject: Ethics
- Publisher: Bloomsbury
- Publication date: 2008
- Publication place: United Kingdom
- Media type: Print (Hardcover)
- Pages: 256
- ISBN: 9781847063472

How to Make Good Decisions and Be Right All the Time is a 2008 book by Iain King. It sets out a history of moral philosophy and presents new ideas in ethics, which have been described as quasi-utilitarianism.

== Summary ==
How to Make Good Decisions and Be Right All the Time has forty chapters, which are grouped into six parts.

=== Part I. The Problem: We Need to Make Decisions, But We Don't Know How (Chapters 1–6) ===
For ethical advice to be credible, the book says it cannot be perceived as arbitrary. The book cites The Dice Man – a man who makes choices based on dice rolls – as an example of advice-following which is arbitrary and so cannot be regarded as ethical.

Chapter three argues intuitions about what we should do can be more useful, but are undermined because our multiple intuitions often lead to contradictory advice (e.g. ‘help a stranger’ or ‘put family first’?). Philosophers have sought to eliminate these contradictions by locating right and wrong in a single part of the decision-making process: for example, in the actions we take (e.g. Kant), in our character (e.g. Aristotle, virtue ethics) or in the consequences of our actions (e.g. Utilitarianism).

Chapter four explains how ‘do whatever is best’ (utilitarianism) still dominates modern philosophical and economic thinking.

Chapter five cites seven faults with utilitarianism. These are that it can be self-defeating; that it considers only future events and ignores the past; that it places decision-making authority in questionable hands; that it doesn’t discriminate fairly between people; that it sacrifices individual concerns to the group interest; that it down-grades promises, fairness and truth-telling; and that it doesn’t offer any clear rules. The chapter also argues that the main argument for utilitarianism is invalid, and ‘empty’.

=== Part II. The Proof: Finding the Basics of Right and Wrong (Chapters 7–14) ===
Part II starts with a secular revision of Pascal’s Wager, arguing “What does it hurt to pursue value and virtue? If there is value, then we have everything to gain, but if there is none, then we haven’t lost anything.” Thus, it rationally makes sense for us to pursue something of value.

It says that “people ultimately derive their choices from what they want to do and what other people want to do”

It then presents four different arguments for deriving a basic principle from which right and wrong can be developed. These are an adaptation of utilitarianism; an adaptation of John Rawls' theory; an argument from evolutionary theory; and a 'Sherlock Holmes' approach.

All four arguments converge on empathy, obligation and the ‘Help Principle’, which the book argues are kernels of a viable ethical system. According to Audrey Tang, King's philosophy advocates: "If spending one unit of your effort could help another person by two units, he detailed in his book, you should help."

=== Part III. The Principle: Refining the Help Principle (Chapters 15–22) ===
Part III defines the Help Principle more carefully, with a section on autonomy, and a critique of the golden rule.

It results in an approach to ethics which combines deontology, consequentialism and virtue ethics. This has been described as quasi-utilitarianism.

=== Part IV. The Program: Extending the Principles to Other Problems (Chapters 23–31) ===
Part IV attempts to distinguish white lies from bad lies. Contradicting Aristotle, who believed no general rule on lying was possible, 'For he who advocates lying can never be believed or trusted,' and St Augustine, who believed all lies were sinful, the book presents a definition of good lies, and argues why it is credible and superior.

Chapters 28 and 29 reconcile individual human rights with group interests. Both individual justice and social justice feature.

=== Part V. Practical Advice: For Real People in the Modern World (Chapters 32–38) ===
Part V deals with situations when information is not certain, and other real world problems which are absent from much academic philosophy. These problems make effective altruism impractical and rare.

Chapter 34 argues that the notion of integrity can only make sense in ethics if it is applied to the consequences people allow to happen rather than to people themselves.

=== Part VI. The Prognosis: How to Make Good Decisions and Be Right All the Time (Chapters 39–40) ===
Part VI claims a hybrid system can be internally-consistent and address several problems of the main schools of ethics.

Chapter 40 concludes it is impossible to make good decisions all the time because we can never know enough about the world, and the consequences of our actions. Hence, ethics can never emulate the scientific revolution by offering a simple set of rules for every situation, similar to those derived by Newton. This is because Newton’s own rules can never be applied perfectly, because we can never know how the world really is.

== About the book ==
The book has a satirical title, and was published on 1 December 2008. It became a bestseller within the category of philosophy books in 2013.

The book attempts to answer the Frege–Geach problem, the fact–value gap, and the open-question argument, although the given answers have been challenged.

The book has been used to reconcile utilitarian and rules-based ethics.

Humanist psychologists have used the book to explain why only proven phenomena is needed to prove why morality exists, and what the parameters of morality should be. Theists have commented on the way the book grounds ethics without recourse to religion.

The book is used to apply ethical considerations to finance and accounting, and has been used to justify certain bad actions as a ‘necessary evil’.

The book has been used in freshman philosophy classes, to teach teenagers, and in SATs.
