= Iain King =

British writer

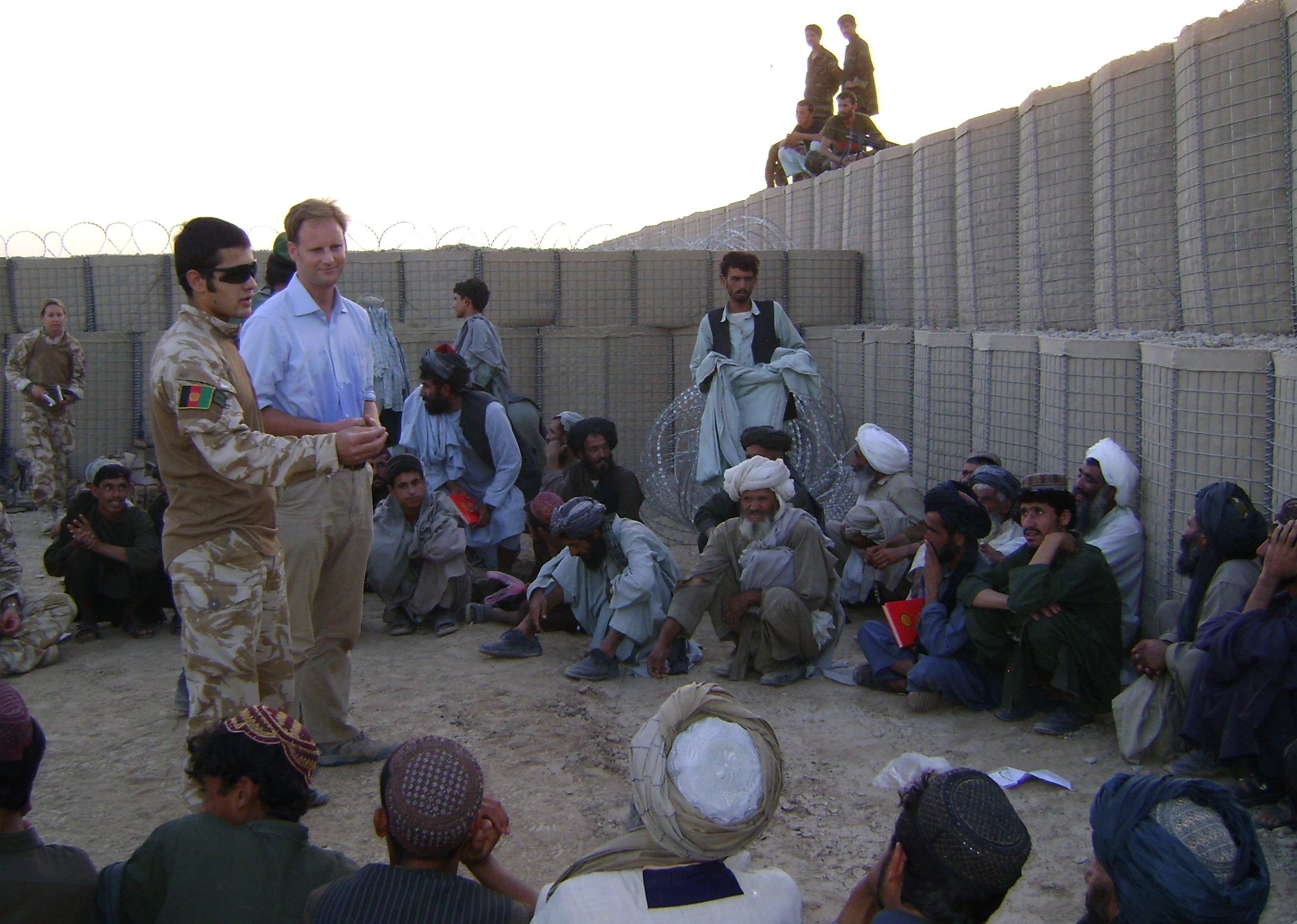
King (centre) in Afghanistan, 2009

Iain Benjamin King is a British writer. King was appointed a Commander of the Order of the British Empire in the 2013 Birthday Honours, for services to governance in Libya, Afghanistan and Kosovo. He is a Scholar at the Modern War Institute, United States Military Academy at West Point, and a former Fellow at the Center for Strategic and International Studies, and at Cambridge University.

== Biography ==
After seven years work on the Northern Ireland peace process in the 1990s, Iain King held a senior political role in Kosovo’s UN Administration, and co-authored a book on the history of Kosovo and the difficulties of post-war state-building in the Balkans, called Peace at Any Price: How the World Failed Kosovo.

His 2008 book, How to Make Good Decisions and Be Right All the Time: Solving the Riddle of Right and Wrong, starts with a history of moral philosophy and then develops a hybrid methodology for ethical decision-making. King's approach has been described as quasi-utilitarian, and credited with reconciling competing systems of ethics.

Secrets of The Last Nazi, based on extensive research of the Nazi era, was King's debut novel, first published in 2015. A sequel followed in 2016.

Making Peace in War is about Afghanistan.

King has been featured as a foreign policy analyst on CNN and BBC, and has written for multiple outlets, many of them based in the US, including NBC, Defense One, Prospect, and National Interest.

== Bibliography ==
- King, Iain; Mason, Whit (2006). Peace at Any Price: How the World Failed Kosovo. Cornell University Press. ISBN 9780801445392.
- King, Iain (2008). How to Make Good Decisions and Be Right All the Time: Solving the Riddle of Right and Wrong. Bloomsbury Publishing. ISBN 978-1-84706-347-2.
- King, Iain (2014). Making Peace in War. Amazon Media.ASIN B00LMTLVOW
- King, Iain (2015). Secrets of The Last Nazi. Bookouture. ISBN 1910751103
- King, Iain (2016). Last Prophecy of Rome. Bookouture.ISBN 9781910751749
- King, Iain (2023), with Deane-Peter Baker, Rufus Black, and Roger Herbert. Ethics at War: How Should Military Personnel Make Ethical Decisions?. Routledge. ISBN 9781032321202
