= Biology of romantic love =

Evolution and neuroscience of romantic love

The biology of romantic love has been explored by such biological sciences as evolutionary psychology, evolutionary biology, anthropology, and neuroscience. Neurochemicals and hormones, such as dopamine and oxytocin, are studied along with a variety of interrelated brain systems (including the reward system) which produce the psychological experience and behaviors of romantic love.

The study of romantic love is still in its infancy. As of 2021, there were a total of 42 biological studies on romantic love. According to the researcher Enzo Emanuele, in light of the comparative lack of neurochemical studies on the early stage of romance, "it would not be surprising that a diversity of biological mechanisms could be involved", due to the complexity of love.

== Definition of romantic love ==
The meaning of the term "romantic love" has changed considerably throughout history, making it difficult to define simply. Initially it referred to the attitudes and behaviors found in certain literary works, now referred to as courtly love. However, academic psychology and especially biology also consider romantic love in a different sense, which refers to a brain system (or systems) related to pair bonding or mating with associated psychological properties.

The evolutionary anthropologists Bode and Kushnick undertook a comprehensive review of romantic love from a biological perspective in 2021. They considered the psychology of romantic love, its mechanisms, development across the lifespan, functions, and evolutionary history. Based on the content of that review, they proposed a biological definition of romantic love:

Romantic love is a motivational state typically associated with a desire for long-term mating with a particular individual. It occurs across the lifespan and is associated with distinctive cognitive, emotional, behavioral, social, genetic, neural, and endocrine activity in both sexes. Throughout much of the life course, it serves mate choice, courtship, sex, and pair-bonding functions. It is a suite of adaptations and by-products that arose sometime during the recent evolutionary history of humans.

The early stage of romantic love (which has obsessive and addictive features) might also be referred to as "being in love", passionate love, infatuation, limerence, or obsessive love. Research has never settled on a unified terminology or set of methods, although "romantic love" being used to refer to this state is the most common in biopsychology.

Distinctions are drawn between this early stage of romantic love and the "attachment system" theorized by the attachment theorists like John Bowlby. Romantic love is also distinct from sexual attraction, although they most often occur together.

Typically, intense romantic love is limited to a duration of 12–18 months or as long as 3 years, depending on the estimate. However, in the phenomenon of long-term intense romantic love, people can experience intense attraction inside a relationship, even for 10 years or more. This is similar to early-stage intense romantic love, but with less obsessional features.

Romantic love is not necessarily "dyadic", "social", or "interpersonal", despite being related to pair bonding. Romantic love can be experienced outside the context of a relationship, as in the case of unrequited love where the feelings are not reciprocated.

== Independent emotion systems ==
Simplified overview of the neurochemical and hormonal basis of love.

Helen Fisher and her colleagues proposed that the brain systems involved with mammalian reproduction can be separated into at least three parts:

Neuroscientists currently believe that the basic emotions arise from distinct circuits (or systems) of neural activity; that humans share several of these primary emotion-motivation circuits with other mammals; and that these brain systems evolved to direct behavior [...]. It is hypothesized that among these primary neural systems are at least three discrete, interrelated emotion-motivation systems in the mammalian brain for mating, reproduction, and parenting: lust, attraction, and attachment [...].

- Lust is the sex drive, or libido.
- Attraction (or early-stage romantic love, also called passionate love or infatuation) is associated with feelings of exhilaration, obsessive (or "intrusive") thoughts, and the craving for emotional union.
- Attachment (the attachment system from attachment theory, and also called companionate love) is associated with feelings of calm, security, and comfort, but separation anxiety when apart.

In Fisher's theory, the systems tend to act in unison, but may become disassociated and act independently. For example, a person in a long-term partnership may feel deep attachment for their spouse, while experiencing intense romantic love (attraction) for some other individual, while being sexually attracted (lust) to still others, all at the same time. Lisa Diamond has also used independent emotions theory to explain why people can 'fall in love' sometimes without sexual desire, as in the case of "platonic" infatuation for a friend.

Fisher associates each system with different neurotransmitters and/or hormones (lust: estrogen & androgens; attraction: dopamine, norepinephrine & serotonin; attachment: oxytocin & vasopressin), but modern research shows these associations are not as clearly defined as Fisher's theory proposes. Additionally, romantic love has been associated with endogenous opioids, cortisol, and nerve growth factor, which are not included in Fisher's earlier model. With respect to the idea that the systems are independent, a more modern theory holds that the attachment system is active in early-stage romantic love, in addition to the infatuation component. Fisher's model is considered outdated, although the idea of interrelated systems is useful.

== Evolution of systems ==
=== Evolutionary psychology ===
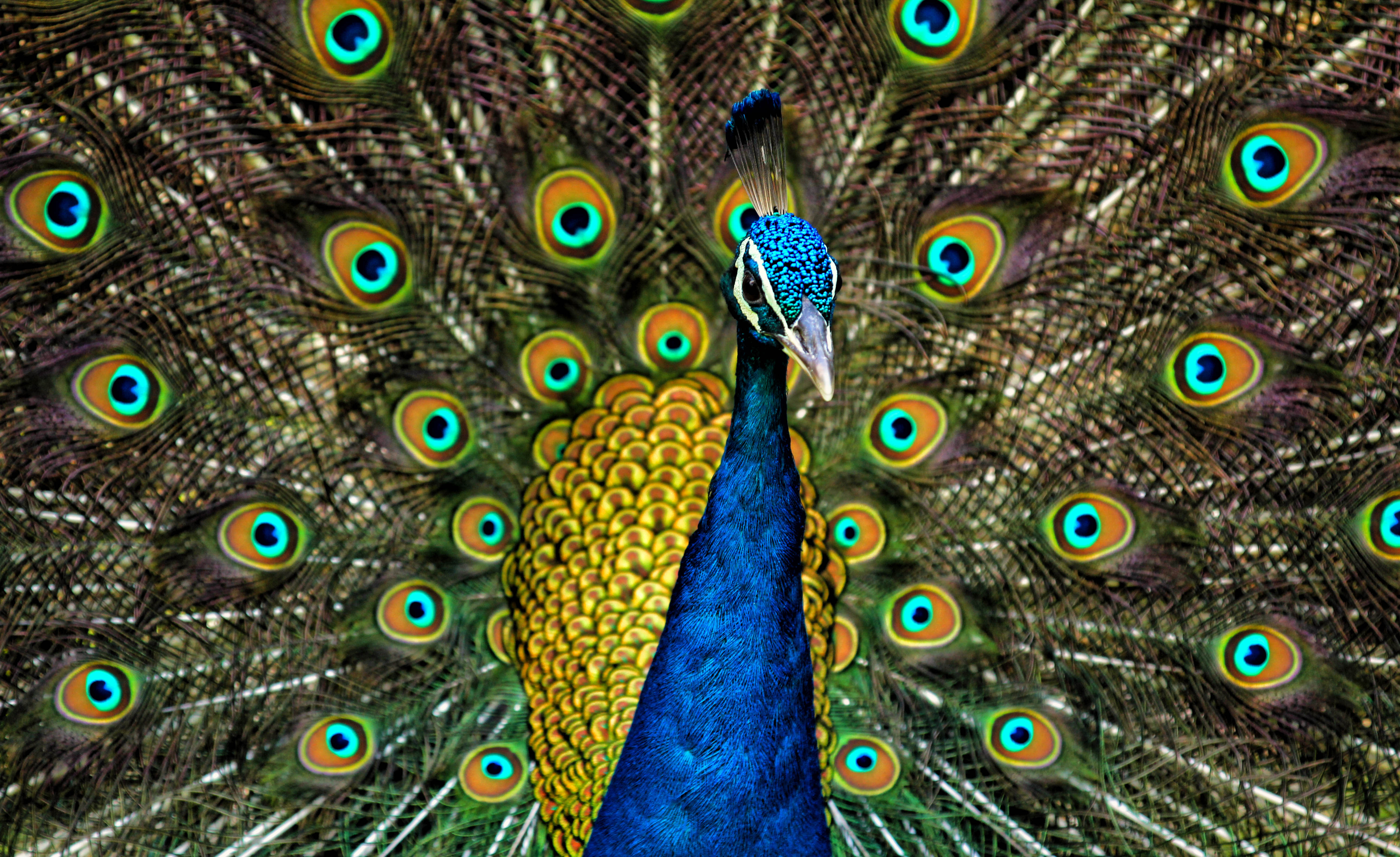
Romantic love might have evolved in part as a courtship display or a handicap signal, similar to a peacock's tail, but signaling commitment.

Evolutionary psychology is seen as an organizing framework which offers explanations behind psychological functions (rather than merely describing them), as well as specifying theoretical constraints, like requiring that a given trait is adaptive in the form of providing reproductive benefit to an individual. Evolutionary psychology has proposed a variety of explanations for romantic love.

- Romantic love is a powerful commitment device. Romantic love suppresses the search for alternative mates (even irrationally so, when a more desirable one comes along), and signals this to the partner. Romantic love may also signal to alternative mates, disincentivizing them from pursuing oneself. The emergence of longer pair bonds in the evolution of humans coincided with the emergence of concealed ovulation, where it cannot (in general) be determined when a woman is ovulating, requiring partners to stay together while having sex during the entire menstrual cycle. Commitment is seen as adaptive to facilitate this, and to facilitate child care. Love feelings might be the psychological reward produced by the brain when the problem of commitment is being solved.
- The intensity of romantic love feelings and why people become "fools for love" can be explained in terms of the handicap principle, which states that a contention arises between honest and fake signaling. When real emotions evolved, a niche would have been created for sham emotions (e.g. fake facial expressions) which are less risky to express. One explanation for why honest signals can evolve without becoming worthless (because of competing fakers) is that the honest signal can evolve if it is too expensive to fake. One example in nature is the peacock's tail, an example of conspicuous consumption, a cumbersome display which consumes nutrients. Only a healthy peacock can afford it, so in that case it may have evolved because it was a handicap, and used by females of the species as an indicator of health. Romantic love may have evolved to be as bewitching and besotting as it is, "like handcuffing oneself to railroad tracks", as a handicap meant to prove that one's commitment is truly real.
- Romantic love may have evolved to override rationality, so that one reproduces regardless of the considerable costs of raising a child, and regardless of any rational will to be single or child-free.
- Romantic love signals parental investment. Paternal investment in the form of pair bonds has been linked to better outcomes for children, both as infants and as they grow older. Children raised in pair bonds are more socially competitive and more likely to survive to reproductive age.
- Being in love makes people more creative, so romantic love may have evolved as a courtship display. It has been suggested that art, music, and literature serve a function like a peacock's tail, but as a display of mental prowess, designed to impress and make a potential partner swoon. Creativity is believed by some authors to be especially a part of the male courtship display.
- Romantic love may conserve time and metabolic energy by focusing courtship efforts on a specific individual over others.
- Successful pair bonding predicts better health and survival. Happy, well-functioning romantic relationships contribute to mental and physical health, especially when stress is encountered. The end of a pair bond (e.g. divorce) is associated with vulnerability, such as to disease, depression, substance abuse, or negative outcomes for children. Victims of a heart attack, for example, are more likely to have another when they live alone.
- Romantic love promotes exclusivity via mate guarding. Romantic jealousy is one of the most common correlates of being in love, which evolved as a protection from the threat of losing one's love to a romantic rival. Jealousy may be adaptive up to a point (when it motivates one to maintain their relationship), but can also take the form of pathological jealousy where a sufferer has a delusional or paranoid belief in their partner's infidelity regardless of actual evidence.
- Monogamous pair bonding helps prevent sexually transmitted diseases (STDs) which compromise fertility, especially for women. Certain STDs (e.g. syphilis) increase the risk of miscarriage, and otherwise harm or can be passed to an unborn child. The strongest predictor of contracting an STD is the number of sexual partners, so limiting this is the best way to limit the risk of contracting a disease which would harm one's reproductive health.

=== Time of evolution ===
Unsolved problem in biology
When did human pair bonding evolve? Is pair bonding an antecedent to romantic love, or have there been other steps in the evolution of pair bonds in humans (e.g. a seasonal bond)?
More unsolved problems in biology

Although the exact moment during human evolution is unknown, modern romantic love is usually believed to have evolved either during or after the time of bipedalism. The earliest hominid found with extensive evidence of bipedalism (and some evidence of pair bonding) is Ardipithecus ramidus, from about 4.4 million years ago, although it may also be the case that bipedalism is older than this. It has been proposed that monogamous pair bonding (which is rare among mammals) evolved during this time, because walking bipedally requires mothers to carry infants in their arms or on their hip, instead of on their backs. With their hands occupied, mothers would be more vulnerable, requiring additional help for food and protection from males of the species (hence, husbands or fathers).

A different selection pressure which has been proposed is the evolution of infant altriciality (immaturity and helplessness) and large brain size at birth, which occurred around 2 million years ago. At this time, brain size became so large that a fully-developed infant's head could not fit through the mother's pelvic birth canal (known as the obstetricial dilemma), requiring the infant to be born early and underdeveloped in comparison to other species. This would have also placed a greater burden on mothers, and made paternal support more valuable.

Due to the general scarcity of evidence, it is still also possible that romantic love (or a precursor to it) predated bipedalism and altriciality, possibly originating in a common ancestor of humans and chimpanzees, 5–8 million years ago. While chimpanzees primarily mate opportunistically, some of their rarer reproductive strategies have features reminiscent of romantic love (involving mate guarding, and a more-than-fleeting association). One assumption behind hypotheses based on fossil evidence is that less sexual dimorphism in body mass (i.e., similarity) is indicative of monogamy, but the comparative similarity between the sexes in human body mass occurred as recently as 500,000 years ago. This suggests that there may have been multiple steps in the evolution of human pair bonding, and romantic love may have evolved during any of these periods.

=== Courtship attraction ===
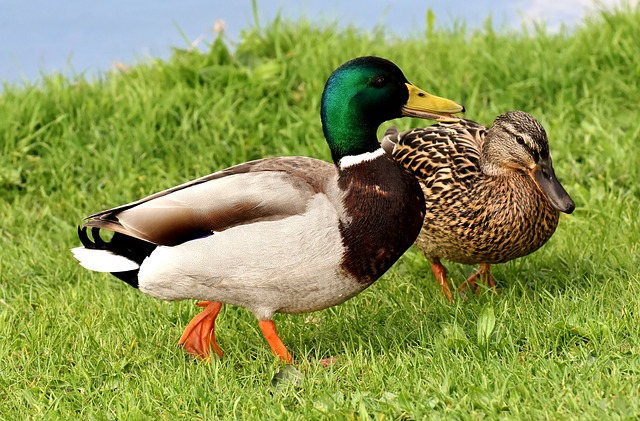
"It was evidently a case of love at first sight, for she swam about the new-comer caressingly ... with overtures of affection" (Darwin, 1871, observing a Mallard).

Helen Fisher's theory is that romantic love (which she considers distinct from attachment) is a motivation system for choosing and focusing energy on a preferred mating partner. According to Fisher, this brain system evolved for mammalian mate choice, also called "courtship attraction". In this phenomenon, a preferred mating partner is chosen based on a display of physical traits (such as a peacock's tail feathers) or other behaviors. For humans, Fisher also includes the attraction to personality traits and other characteristics in her mate choice theory. In most species, courtship attraction is as brief as lasting only minutes, hours, days, or weeks, but intense romantic love can last much longer in humans. Fisher believes that during the timeline of human evolution, mammalian courtship attraction may have become prolonged and intensified as pair bonding evolved, eventually becoming the phenomenon of romantic love today.

A critique of Fisher's theory published by Adam Bode holds that courtship attraction only encompasses love at first sight attraction or a crush, and the core components of romantic love (including the intense attraction and obsessive thoughts, in addition to attachment) evolved as a co-option of mother-infant bonding. A study on love at first sight found that, even though people reporting the experience retrospectively will recall features resembling passionate love ("constant thoughts about the person and the desire to be with [them]"), people reporting love at first sight currently after just meeting the potential partner only report neutral scores (neither agreeing nor disagreeing) on a romantic love measure that includes a passion component. Some authors have speculated that the remembered account of falling in love at first sight (with high passion) is often actually a memory confabulation. Furthermore, the study found that the experience of love at first sight was related to the physical attractiveness of the potential partner. This led the researchers to conclude that love at first sight is actually a strong initial attraction, rather than resembling the state of being in love. Bode argues this more closely resembles the concept of courtship attraction, and can be considered a separate system from core romantic love components.

Courtship attraction shares similar behaviors with romantic love in humans, and both involve activation of dopaminergic reward circuits. Courtship attraction may be characterized by dopamine, oxytocin and opioid activity, but little is known about it because existing studies were not designed to target it.

=== Co-option of mother-infant bonding ===
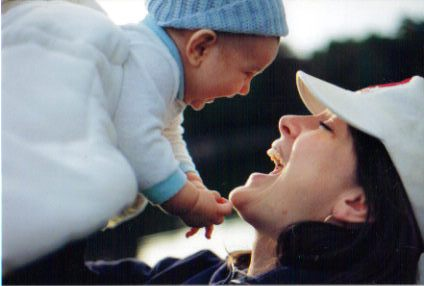
Mother with child

Co-option is an evolutionary process whereby a given trait is repurposed to take on a new function. One example is how a number of species of fish (e.g. catfish) have co-opted their gas bladder to produce sound. Co-opted traits can be morphological, but also behavioral. Co-option has been used as an explanation of how a species can develop an evolutionary adaptation very quickly sometimes, seemingly faster than Darwinism could explain. With this process, a seemingly "new" trait can develop quickly because its structure predated the time of adaptation, only needing to be modified to function in a new way. In some cases, co-option involves one gene whose function is altered, while in other cases the co-opted gene is a duplicate and the function of the original gene is retained. The terms "co-option" and "exaptation" are closely related, but have different connotations, as exaptation refers to structural continuity when a trait takes on a new function.

Adam Bode has proposed that romantic love is "a suite of adaptations and by-products" consisting of a number of interrelated systems, several of which evolved by co-opting mother-infant bonding (attraction for bonding, obsessive thinking, and attachment). The co-option theory says that the genes that regulate mother-infant bonding were recreated and took on a new function. Courtship attraction and sexual desire are "causally linked adjuncts" which were not co-opted, but were combined and modified in romantic love. The theory is based on the available human evidence, but also a literature arising from research on prairie voles that pair bonding uses the same mechanisms that mother-infant bonding uses.

Academic literature has drawn a parallel between romantic love and the mother–infant dyad since the 1980s, with attachment theorists like Cindy Hazan and Phillip Shaver believing they share a common biological process. In 1981, Glenn Wilson suggested a close analogy between adult lovers and the kind of infant attachment studied by John Bowlby. In 1999, James Leckman and Linda Mayes compared features of romantic love and early parental love, finding substantial similarities. Both are altered mental states featuring preoccupations, exclusivity of focus, longing for reciprocity, and idealization of the other. The trajectories of both also share similarities, with preoccupation increasing during courtship (for romantic love) and around the time of birth (for parental love), then diminishing after a relationship is established (for romantic love) or shortly after the postpartum period (for parental love). (The use of "baby talk" by romantic lovers is another "uncanny" similarity.)

In 2004, Andreas Bartels and Semir Zeki were the first to compare romantic love and maternal love with fMRI. This comparison looked at areas known to contain high densities of receptors for the attachment hormones oxytocin and vasopressin. Bartels and Zeki found precise overlap in some specific areas including the striatum (putamen, globus pallidus, and caudate nucleus) and some overlap in the ventral tegmental area, areas with dopamine, and oxytocin receptors. Each type of love was also associated with other unique activations. Notably, maternal love involved the periaqueductal gray matter, an area associated with endogenous pain suppression during intense emotional experiences such as childbirth. Two meta-analyses of fMRI experiments have also found similarities between maternal love and romantic love. A 2022 meta-analysis by Shih et al. found that both types of love were associated with the left ventral tegmental area (more associated with the pleasurable aspect of reward, or "liking"), while in addition romantic love also involved the right ventral tegmental area (more associated with reward "wanting").

In 2003, Lisa Diamond suggested that adult pair bonding is an exaptation of the affectional bond between infants and caregivers, using this to explain phenomena such as romantic friendships and "platonic" infatuations, or i.e. "romantic" passion without sexual desire. Some instances of this are reported by Dorothy Tennov in her study of "limerence" (i.e. love madness, commonly for an unreachable person), in which a younger woman who otherwise considered herself heterosexual would have this type of reaction towards an older woman. Among other examples are schoolgirls falling "violently in love with each other, and suffering all the pangs of unrequited attachment, desperate jealousy etc." (historically called a "smash"), and Native American men who seemed to fall in love with each other and form intense, but non-sexual bonds. Helen Fisher's theory that sexual desire is a separate system from romantic love and attachment is also given as theoretical evidence. Diamond argues that romantic love without sexual desire can even happen in contradiction to one's sexual orientation: because it would not have been adaptive for a parent to only be able to bond with an opposite sex child, so the systems must have evolved independently from sexual orientation. People most often fall in love because of sexual desire, but Diamond suggests time spent together and physical touch can serve as a substitute. Diamond believes the connection between romantic love and sexual desire is "bidirectional" in that either one can cause the other to occur because of shared oxytocin pathways in the brain.

=== New model ===
Based on contentions over evolutionary theories and Fisher's outdated neurochemical model, Bode has suggested Fisher's model, while useful and the predominant one for a time, is oversimplified and proposes five systems:

- Sexual desire is associated with a drive to initiate and be receptive to sexual activity. Testosterone, dopamine, serotonin, norepinephrine, acetylcholine, histamine, and opioids have been implicated in sexual behavior.
- Courtship attraction is for choosing and focusing energy on a preferred mating partner and promotes courtship behaviors. It can take the form of love at first sight attraction or a crush and also be intertwined with other forms of attraction, but might not precede a relationship in all cases. Courtship attraction may be associated with dopamine, oxytocin, and opioids.
- Bonding attraction is the type of attraction for pair bond formation, characterized by a strong desire for proximity, separation anxiety when apart, exclusivity of focus, and heightened awareness of the loved one. Bonding attraction is associated with dopamine and oxytocin activity, especially in the ventral tegmental area. According to Bode's arguments, this is the type of romantic attraction shown in fMRI experiments of early-stage romantic love.
- Obsessive thinking involves preoccupation or intrusive thinking about the loved one. Some authors have drawn a comparison between this feature and obsessive-compulsive disorder, suggesting they share similar neurobiology, but the evidence for that is limited and ambiguous.
- Attachment is for pair bond maintenance, or maintaining very close personal relationships, with psychological features like a heightened sense of responsibility, longing for reciprocity, and a powerful sense of empathy. Attachment is associated with oxytocin, dopamine, and opioid activity, but there is also some evidence for the involvement of vasopressin.

Bode suggests that the systems of bonding attraction, obsessive thinking and attachment (the three systems which were co-opted from mother-infant bonding) together form the core of romantic love (the necessary components). However, all five systems are merged into one single phenomenon of romantic love, with a variety of different outcomes depending on the circumstances.

== Mechanics ==
=== Reward, motivation and addiction ===
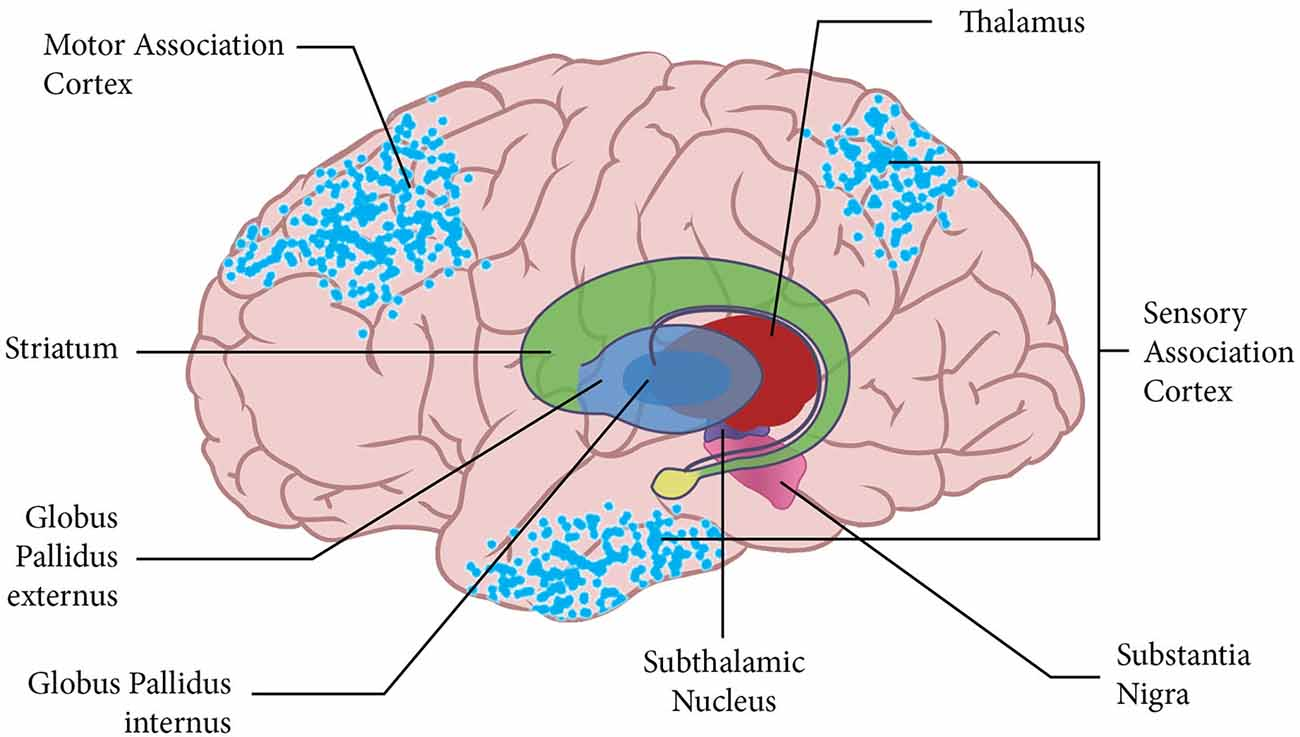
Anatomy of the basal ganglia.

Approximate location of the nucleus accumbens relative to the basal ganglia.

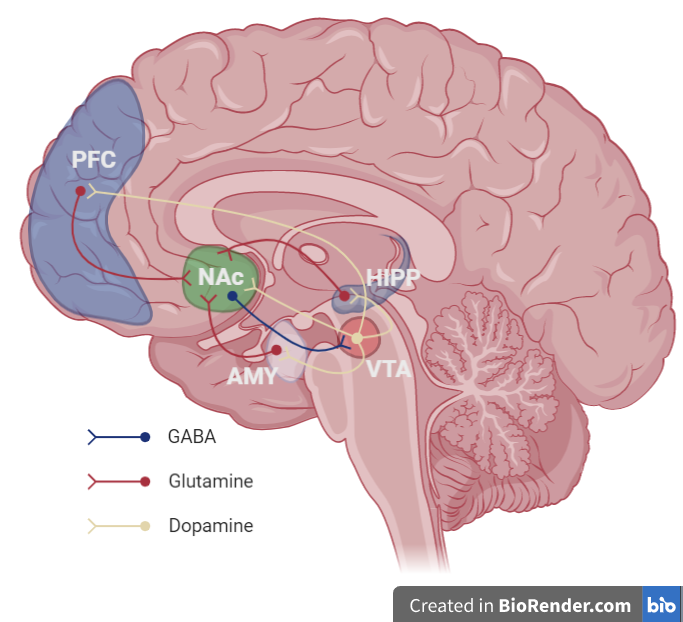
Key connections in the mesocorticolimbic pathway: ventral tegmental area (VTA); nucleus accumbens (NAc); prefrontal cortex (PFC); amygdala (AMY); hippocampus (HIPP).

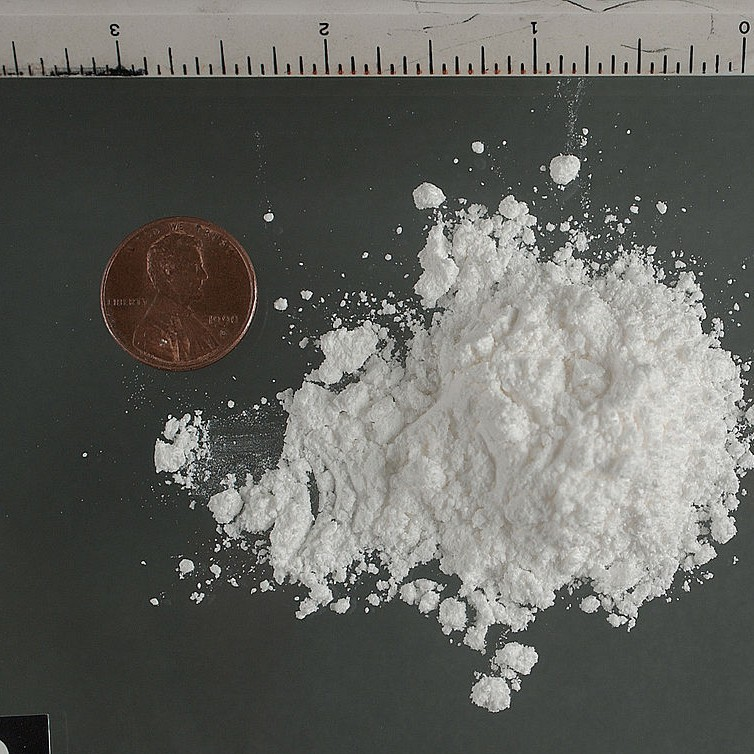
Love acts in a manner "not unlike cocaine"; both work on the dopamine system. Cocaine seems to hijack the reward system by artificially overstimulating dopamine neurons.

The early stage of romantic love is being compared to a behavioral addiction (i.e., addiction to a non-substance) but the "substance" involved is the loved person. Addiction involves a phenomenon known as incentive salience, also called "wanting" (in quotes). This is the property by which cues in the environment stand out to a person and become attention-grabbing and attractive, like a "motivational magnet" which pulls a person towards a particular reward. Incentive salience differs from craving in that craving is a conscious experience while incentive salience may or may not be. While incentive salience can give feelings of strong urgency to cravings, it can also motivate behavior unconsciously, as in an experiment where cocaine users were unaware of their own decisions to choose a low dose of cocaine (which they believed was placebo) more often than an actual placebo. In the incentive-sensitization theory of addiction, repeated drug use renders the brain hypersensitive to drugs and drug cues, resulting in pathological levels of "wanting" to use drugs. People in love are thought to experience incentive salience in response to their beloved. Lovers share other similarities with addicts as well, like tolerance, dependence, withdrawal, relapse, craving, and mood modification.

Incentive salience is mediated by dopamine projections in the mesocorticolimbic pathway of the brain, an area generally involved with reward, motivation, and reinforcement learning. Dopamine signaling for incentive salience originates in the ventral tegmental area (VTA) and projects to areas such as the nucleus accumbens (NAc) in the ventral striatum. The VTA is one of two main areas of the brain with neurons which produce dopamine (the other being the substantia nigra pars compacta). Projections from the VTA innervate the NAc, where dopamine activity attaches motivational significance to stimuli associated with rewards. Brain scans of people in love using fMRI (commonly while looking at a photograph of their beloved) show activations in these areas like the VTA and NAc. Another dopamine-rich area of the reward system shown to be active in romantic love is the caudate nucleus, containing 80% of the brain's dopamine receptor sites, located in the dorsal striatum. The dorsal striatum is implicated in reinforcement learning, and the caudate nucleus has shown activity in response to a monetary reward and cocaine. This activity in reward and motivation areas suggests that early-stage intense romantic love is a motivation system or goal-oriented state (rather than a specific emotion), consistent with the description of romantic love as a desire or longing for union with another person. These activations are also consistent with the similarity between romantic love and addiction.

In addiction research, a distinction is drawn between "wanting" a reward (i.e., incentive salience, tied to mesocorticolimbic dopamine) and "liking" a reward (i.e., pleasure, tied to hedonic hotspots), aspects which are dissociable. People can be addicted to drugs and compulsively seek them out, even when taking the drug no longer results in a high or the addiction is detrimental to one's life. They can also irrationally "want" (i.e. feel compelled towards, in the sense of incentive salience) something which they do not cognitively wish for. In a similar way, people who are in love may "want" a loved person even when interactions with them are not pleasurable. For example, they may want to contact an ex-partner after a rejection, even when the experience will only be painful. It is also possible for a person to be "in love" with somebody they do not like, or who treats them poorly.

Academics have proposed a number of theories for how addictions begin and perpetuate. One prominent theory developed by Wolfram Schultz involves a dopamine signal which encodes a reward prediction error (RPE): the difference between the predicted value of a reward, which would be received by performing a particular action, and the actual value upon receiving it: whether the reward was better, equal to or worse than expected. In this theory, dopamine is also part of a mechanism for reinforcement learning which associates rewards with the cues which predicted them. Drugs of abuse like cocaine hijack this mechanism by artificially overstimulating dopamine neurons, mimicking an RPE signal which is much stronger than could be produced naturally. An alternative model developed by Kent Berridge and Terry Robinson states that dopamine signaling causes the motivational output (incentive salience) which is proportional to RPE, but that the dopamine signal itself may be an effect of learning rather than causing it directly. There is, however, said to be overwhelming evidence that dopamine guides learning in addition to motivation. The computation of dopamine signaling is complicated, with inputs from a variety of areas in the brain, although its output (primarily from the VTA) is a relatively homogeneous signal encoding the level of RPE. One study has investigated whether people in long-term romantic relationships experienced RPE in response to having expectations about their partners' appraisal of them validated or violated, indicating they do. This study used fMRI to find that reward areas like the VTA and striatum responded in a way consistent with other research on RPE. Most fMRI studies of romantic love have had participants look at a photograph, and the resulting reward system activity has been interpreted in terms of salience.

Research has not investigated whether romantic love shares all of the neurobiological aspects of addiction. Despite similarities, there are also differences between romantic love and addiction. One of the major differences is that the trajectories diverge, with the addictive aspects tending to disappear over time during a relationship in romantic love. By comparison, in a drug addiction, the detrimental aspects magnify over time with repeated drug use, turning into compulsions, a loss of control and a negative emotional state. It has been speculated that the difference between these could be related to oxytocin activity present in romantic love, but not in addiction. Oxytocin seems to ameliorate the effects of drug withdrawal, and it might inhibit the more long-term, excessive effects of addiction.

Academics do not universally agree on whether or not love is always an addiction or when it needs to be treated. The term "love addiction" has had an amorphous definition over the years and does not yet denote a psychiatric condition, but recently one definition has been developed that "Individuals addicted to love tend to experience negative moods and affects when away from their partners and have the strong urge and craving to see their partner as a way of coping with stressful situations." Other authors include rejected lovers as love addicts, or specify that love is an addiction when it involves abnormal processes which carry negative consequences. A broader view is that all love is addiction, or simply an appetite, similar to how humans are dependent on food. Research on behavioral addictions is more limited than research on drugs of abuse; however, there is a growing body of evidence that some people are susceptible to showing brain patterns in response to natural rewards (food, sex, etc.) similar to drug addicts, particularly in the case of gambling addiction. Romantic love may be a "natural" addiction, which differs from the nature of drug addiction in that love may be prosocial and has been evolved for the purpose of pair bonding. Helen Fisher, Arthur Aron and colleagues have proposed that romantic love is a "positive addiction" (i.e. not harmful) when requited and a "negative addiction" when unrequited or inappropriate.

=== Oxytocin, bonding, and attraction ===
Location of the hypothalamus and pituitary.

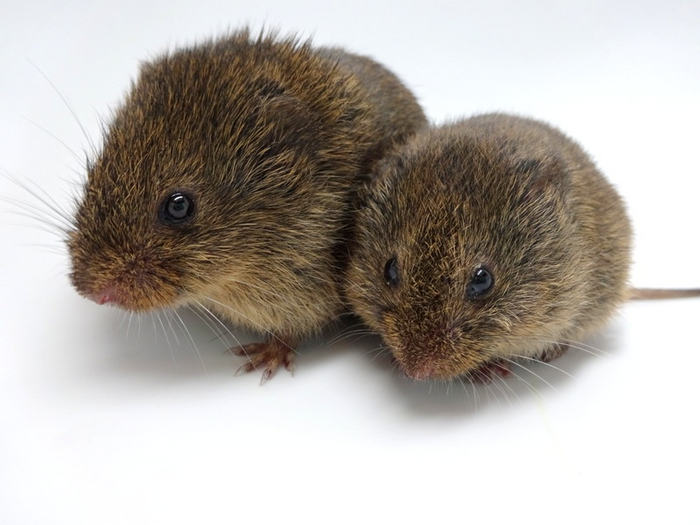
Much of the research on oxytocin comes from experiments on monogamous prairie voles.

Oxytocin is sometimes called the "love hormone", because of its involvement in the mechanisms of maternal behavior and adult pair bonding. Oxytocin is synthesized primarily in an area of the hypothalamus and released into the blood via the pituitary gland, where it has been found circulating in people in the early stages of romantic love. Additionally, the hypothalamus projects oxytocin to other areas of the brain, like the ventral tegmental area (VTA), nucleus accumbens (NAc), amygdala, and hippocampus. The projections to reward areas (VTA and NAc) are thought to modulate social salience, or i.e. the level of dopamine activity in response to socially-relevant stimuli. This oxytocin signaling in reward pathways may also be the source of salience in response to a loved one.

A placebo-controlled study found that administering intranasal oxytocin enhanced facial attractiveness of a romantic partner while viewing a photograph, as compared to an unfamiliar face. The effect was also measured using fMRI, which found enhanced brain activity in reward areas like the VTA and NAc. Another fMRI study found dopamine-rich genetic expression of an oxytocin receptor gene in the left VTA, and the left VTA has also been found active in response to facial attractiveness. In humans, circulating oxytocin levels have been associated with higher levels of interaction between partners, and also predicted which couples would still be together 6 months later. Anna Machin calls the combination of oxytocin and dopamine the "glue" which makes the early stages of a relationship possible.

The role of oxytocin in human behavior is varied and complex. Oxytocin lowers inhibitions to forming new relationships by deactivating the amygdala, involved with processing fear and anxiety. Oxytocin can be released with physical touch, hence it's also sometimes called the "cuddle hormone". Oxytocin also plays a role in sexual behavior, being released during sexual arousal and orgasm. Aside from romantic and parental bonding, oxytocin activity has a role in the interactions with peers or strangers, for example facilitating facial recognition and eye contact. Oxytocin is believed to facilitate trust and altruistic behaviors towards in-groups (e.g. partners or children), but also aggression towards out-groups (e.g. strangers or conspecifics).

Much of the research on oxytocin comes from experiments on monogamous prairie voles (notably by Larry Young), but this research is also used for making inferences about humans. In prairie voles, both oxytocin and dopamine signaling have been shown to influence pair bond development. For example, the number of oxytocin receptors in the NAc is positively related to how fast a partner preference is formed. A partner preference can also be prevented by injecting either a dopamine or oxytocin receptor antagonist (a drug which blocks transmission) into the NAc of a prairie vole directly.

In a contemporary model of the brain systems involved with romantic love, this type of salience (or 'bonding attraction') is present throughout the entire time a person is experiencing romantic love, including during the early stages. This contrasts with some previous theories (e.g. proposed by Helen Fisher in 1998) which stated that oxytocin activity and dopamine activity were distinct (and independent) systems, and that oxytocin activity only became prominent at some later stage of a relationship. Levels of oxytocin would still vary from situation to situation because of differing types of stimuli, for example because of less regular interaction and physical touch in cases of unrequited love. This could be used to explain some of the maladaptive symptoms of infatuation (e.g. sleep difficulties, social anxiety, clammy hands, etc.), when dopaminergic activity is high without the calming effect of oxytocin from the attachment system.

=== Brain opioid theory of social attachment ===
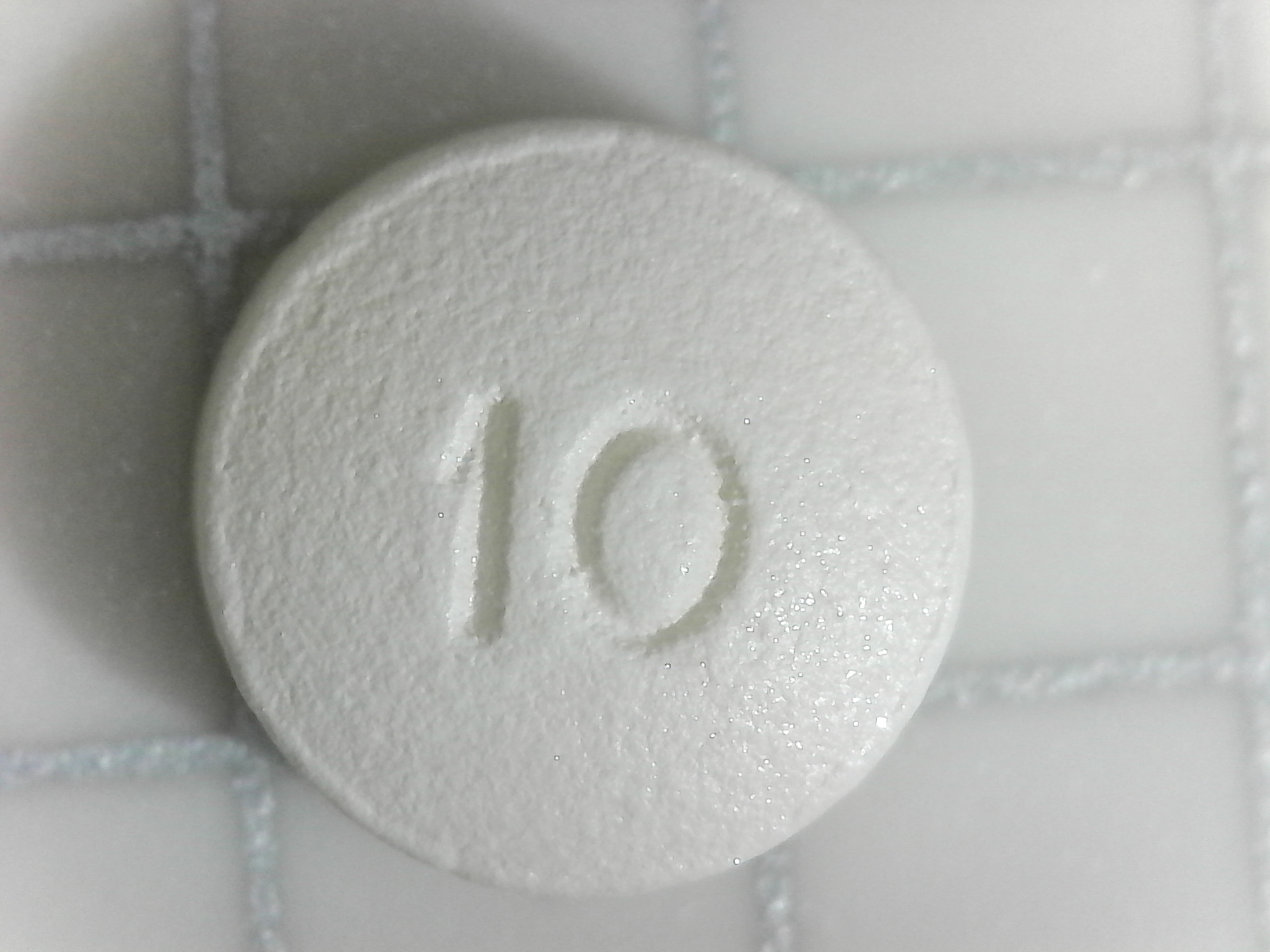
Oxycodone 10mg

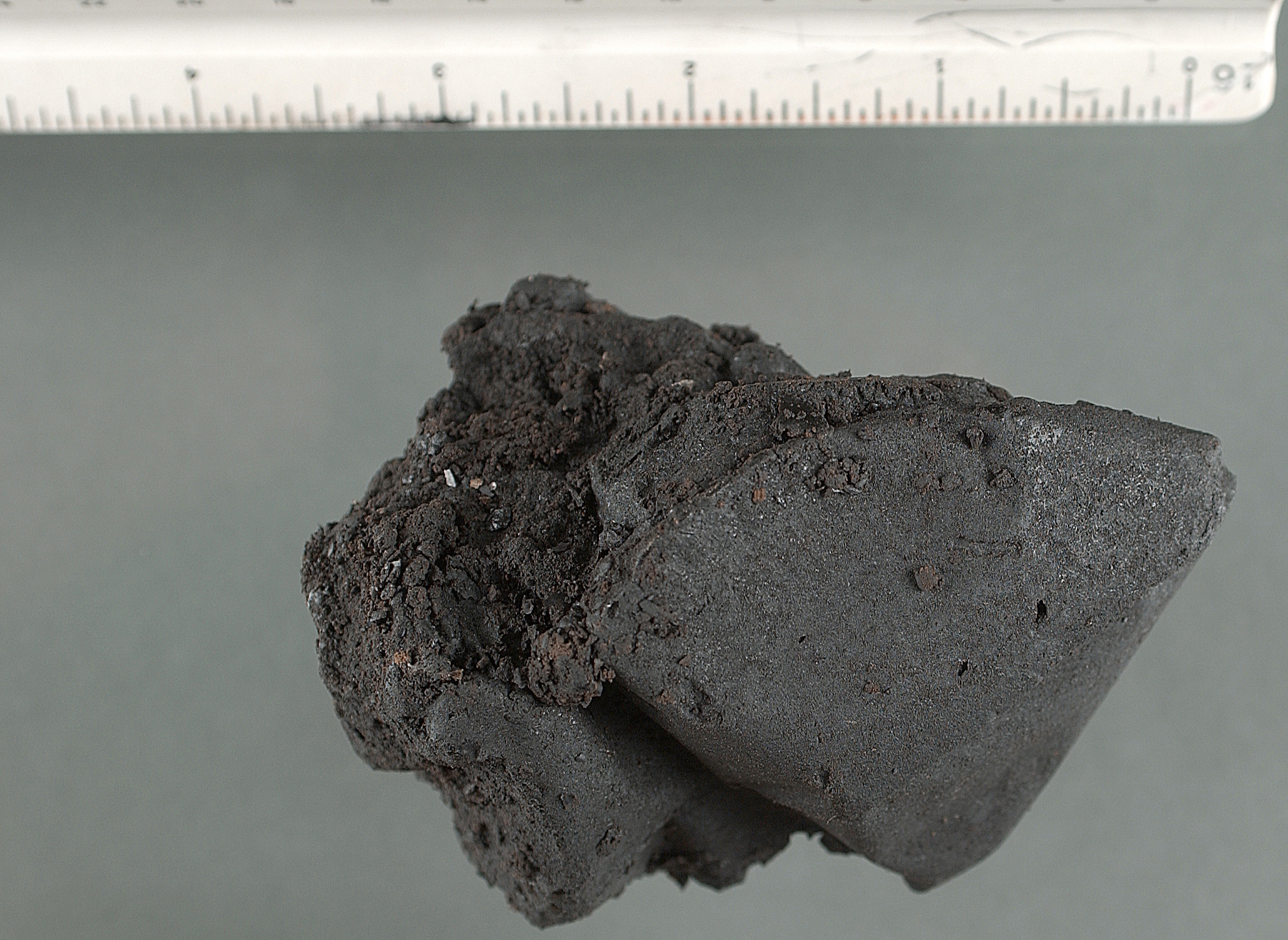
Black tar heroin The addictive aspects of love may resemble opioid addiction in respects.

Modern research is increasingly showing the importance of endogenous opioids in love and social attachment, particularly the β-endorphin (the most potent endogenous opioid) and the μ-opioid receptor system. While opioids have their origin being the body's natural painkiller, they're also implicated in a variety of other systems, essentially like neurotransmitters. Opioid receptors are located throughout the brain, including in the limbic system (affecting basic emotions) and neocortex (affecting more conscious decision-making). Opioids are linked to the consummatory part of reward, or i.e. "liking" or pleasure, and released in areas of the brain called hedonic hotspots (or pleasure centers). Hedonic hotspots are located in the nucleus accumbens, the ventral pallidum and other areas. This function includes social reward, or the pleasurable aspect of social interactions.

The brain opioid theory of social attachment (BOTSA) is a long-running theory summarizing this connection, originally formulated in the 1980s and 1990s, based on a proposal by the psychiatrist Michael Liebowitz and research by the neuroscientist Jaak Panksepp. Starting in the 1990s, opioids were overshadowed by the interest in oxytocin and largely overlooked until more recently, possibly because of the difficulty studying them (requiring e.g. a PET scan, which is expensive). Opioids have been connected to a variety of social experiences, including the early stage of romantic love and attachment styles. While the addictive aspects of love have been compared to cocaine or amphetamine addiction, other aspects may also resemble an opioid addiction.

BOTSA (as it was originally conceived of) predicts that in the absence of social relationships, individuals will have comparatively lower levels of endogenous opioids, motivating them to initiate contact with other people. Social contact then leads to feelings of euphoria and contentment, but individuals also need to continue contact to avoid withdrawal symptoms. Liebowitz originally argued that romantic relationships resemble narcotic addiction and that individual neurochemical differences could also explain why some people are unable to commit, or stay in abusive relationships. Earlier experiments on BOTSA were animal studies, but in the 2000s this has been expanded to include human experiments.

Among the animal studies which have been done, there is some evidence that separation distress is akin to opioid withdrawal. Studies on chicks, puppies, Guinea pigs, rats, sheep, and monkeys have shown that administrating morphine reduces distress vocalizations when separated from the mother, and administrating naloxone (an opioid antagonist) increases them, even in the presence of other members of the same species. In another study, mutant mouse pups with a μ-opioid receptor knockout (lacking the μ-receptor gene) vocalized less frequently in response to isolation than normal mice. Administration of morphine had no effect on distress vocalization frequency in the knockout mice, despite reducing it in normal mice. Furthermore, these knockout mice had a reduced preference for their mother's odor, which is normally the result of conditioning mediated by the endogenous opioid system. In nonhuman primates, studies have suggested that endogenous opioids provide the euphoria behind dyadic social grooming behaviors. Other animal studies have shown that endogenous opioids play a role in the desire for rough-and-tumble play (a physical, but also social behavior). In humans, physical activity with a social element (rowing, dancing, laughing) increased pain tolerance more when the activities were synchronized with other people.

An fMRI experiment in 2010 investigated whether viewing a picture of a romantic partner could reduce pain sensitivity, and which areas of the brain became active. Participants were exposed to high temperatures (resulting in moderate or high pain levels) while viewing a picture of a romantic partner (whom they were intensely in love with), or a friend, or performing a word association task which has also been shown to reduce pain via distraction. Participants were then asked to rate how much pain they felt on a pain scale, and both viewing a romantic partner and performing the distraction task (but not viewing a friend) were found to reduce pain levels. The fMRI scans revealed that viewing a romantic partner activated reward circuits in the brain, while the distraction task did not. Brain areas were also correlated with pain relief to reveal that reward analgesia and distraction analgesia involved distinct areas. Some areas associated with sensory processing of pain also had decreased activity while viewing a romantic partner. An earlier experiment showed that viewing photos of a romantic partner reduced experimental pain, but did not pair it with a brain scan.

A PET scan experiment in 2016 investigated whether non-sexual social touching between romantic partners was mediated by endogenous opioid activity. This study found that social touch did have an effect, but unexpectedly found that social touching decreased opioid activity in the brain rather than increasing it (despite being rated as pleasurable by participants). This is in contrast with prior PET research that pleasant affect is related to increased opioid activity. One possible explanation is that touching decreases stress, so this might also decrease the ongoing opioid activity in response to distress and pain. As this is also at odds (to some extent) with primate studies on grooming, there may be some variation between species in how opioids are involved with social reward. Other modern studies on humans include blood plasma levels, genetics and studies with drugs like morphine and naltrexone to see how they change social perception and behavior.

=== Obsessive thinking ===
Unlike OCD, passionate love (as in limerence) starts with a period of intoxicating joy, and only later reaches a state of anxiety when unrequited. The thoughts also differ in function and content. In addiction, the early stage starts with positive reinforcement (binging and intoxication), but over time a transition occurs towards a more compulsive stage of negative reinforcement (avoiding withdrawal). This later stage (of negative reinforcement) is a possible parallel with OCD (where compulsions relieve tension or anxiety).

Obsessive thinking about a loved one has been called a hallmark or a cardinal trait of romantic love, ensuring that the loved one is not forgotten. Some reports have been made that people can even spend as much as 85 to 100% of their days and nights thinking about a love object. One study found that on average people in love spent 65% of their waking hours thinking about their beloved. Another study used cluster analysis to find several different groups of lovers, with the least intense group spending 35% of their time on average and the most intense at 72%. Since the late 1990s, these obsessional features have been compared to obsessive–compulsive disorder (OCD). This is also sometimes paired with a theory that obsessive (or intrusive) thinking is related to serotonin levels being lowered while in love, although study results have been inconsistent or negative. Another theory relates obsessive thinking to addiction, because drug users exhibit obsessive thoughts about drug use as well as compulsions.

In 1999, James Leckman and Linda Mayes published a theoretical comparison between early-stage romantic love, early parental love, and OCD. This paper was intended as an investigation into the origin of OCD, but it also relates to the evolutionary theory of romantic love. Both early-stage romantic love and OCD share features of preoccupation, intrusive thoughts, a heightened sense of responsibility, a need for things to be "just right", and some proximity-seeking behaviors. In some cases, obsessions experienced by OCD patients relate to what harms might happen to a family member, which resembles some behavioral patterns involved with romantic and parental love. The authors also speculate that psychasthenia (feelings of incompleteness, insufficiency, or imperfection) resembles the "longing for reciprocity" and idealization which are features of romantic love.

Two experiments have investigated whether there is a relationship between romantic love and serotonin levels, by taking different measures using blood samples. Although serotonin levels in the central nervous system would actually be the measure of interest, it has been assumed that measures of peripheral serotonin can be used as a marker for this. A 1999 experiment led by Donatella Marazziti found that people in love had platelet serotonin transporter (SERT) density which was lower than controls, and similar to the density of a group of unmedicated OCD patients. Six of the 20 in-love participants were also retested after a period of 12 to 18 months, and SERT density had returned to normal. However, because Marazziti's experiment looked at SERT (rather than serotonin directly), this makes it ambiguous whether serotonin levels were actually higher or lower. SERT transports serotonin from blood plasma back into the platelets, so that a reduction in SERT could correspond to an increased plasma level.

Another experiment in 2012 led by Sandra Langeslag which looked at blood serotonin levels found a contradictory result, with men and women being affected differently. Men had lower serotonin levels than controls, but women had higher serotonin levels. In women, obsessive thinking was also actually associated with increased serotonin. A 2025 study led by Adam Bode also found no association between SSRI use and obsessive thinking about a loved one, or the intensity of romantic love. Therefore, although the earlier experiments do suggest romantic love and serotonin are probably associated, the authors suggest that the idea of obsessive thinking being attributed to lowered serotonin levels seems inaccurate.

=== Rejection ===
Rather than being a specific emotion itself, romantic love is believed to be a motivation or drive which elicits different emotions depending on the situation: positive feelings when things go well, and negative feelings when awry. Reciprocated love may elicit feelings of joy, ecstasy, or fulfillment, for example, but unrequited love or separation may elicit feelings of sadness, anxiety, or despair.

In 2010, Helen Fisher, Arthur Aron and colleagues published their fMRI experiment investigating which areas of the brain might be active in recently rejected lovers. Participants had been in a relationship with their ex-partner for an average of 21 months, and then were post-rejection for an average of 63 days at the time of the experiment. These participants reported spending more than 85% of their waking hours thinking of their rejector, reported a lack of emotional control, and exhibited unhappiness, with sometimes more extreme emotions like depression, anger, and even paranoia in pre- and post-interviews.

Similar to other fMRI experiments of people in love, the scan while looking at a photograph of the rejecting partner showed activations in dopaminergic reward system areas, like the ventral tegmental area and nucleus accumbens. These activations were also stronger than in a previous experiment of participants who were happily in love. The active nucleus accumbens, prefrontal cortex, and orbitofrontal cortex have been associated with assessing one's gains and losses, and active areas of the insular cortex and anterior cingulate cortex have been involved with physical pain and pain regulation (respectively) in other studies.

=== Stress and physiological arousal ===
In the early stages of romantic love, individuals may start out hypervigilant (hyperaware and sensitive to a partner's cues) due to uncertainty and novelty, but become synchronized over time as a relationship progresses. Bonding is thought to be in part facilitated by coordinated behaviors which display reciprocity and events which evoke beneficial stress, like a passionate kiss. The stress response system involves two major systems: the autonomic nervous system and the hypothalamic–pituitary–adrenal axis (HPA axis). Some experiments have been done which support the idea that the stress response is involved during the early stage of romantic love, measuring cortisol levels; however, these experiments have been inconsistent with respect to cortisol being higher or lower.

In drug addiction, corticotropin release factor (CRF) is involved with the aversive effects of withdrawal. Stress causes CRF to release into the ventral tegmental area and nucleus accumbens shell, motivating reinstatement of drug use. A similar effect is also hypothesized in pair bonds, where stress after separation or social loss motivates a person to return to the partner; however, experiments have not investigated this in humans, only rodents.

Helen Fisher believed that separation anxiety activates the HPA axis, producing these stress hormones. It's ironic, she says, because short-term stress can also produce dopamine and norepinephrine, so "as the adored one slips away, the very chemicals that contribute to feelings of romance grow even more potent".

=== Nerve growth factor ===
Romantic love has been associated with nerve growth factor (NGF), a neurochemical in the family of neurotrophins, which are described as regulating synaptic plasticity and mediating anxiety, emotions and behavioral modifications. A study led by Enzo Emanuele tested subjects who were "truly, deeply and madly in love" in relationships, measuring blood plasma levels of neurotrophins, and comparing them with a control group. Levels of the neurotrophins BDNF, NT-3 and NT-4 were not different between people in love and controls; however, in love subjects did have NGF which was significantly elevated, and furthermore associated with increased Passionate Love Scale scores.

Emanuele et al. therefore interprets NGF as relating to the emotional changes during falling in love (emotional dependency and/or euphoria). Other research has shown that NGF can increase HPA axis activation, and induce the release of vasopressin (implicated in social bonding). An alternative explanation offered by the authors is that NGF could be elevated in romantic love only as a secondary effect of stressful conditions and/or arousal associated with the start of a social bond, but this was unsupported by the study, which found NGF did not correlate with measures of anxiety and depression.

Additionally, after 12–24 months, 39 of the 58 in love subjects were retested, and NGF levels were back to normal. Based on this study, it was reported in the BBC that romantic love "lasts just about a year".

=== Frustration attraction and uncertainty ===
Dopamine neurons in the ventral tegmental area are theorized to encode a "reward prediction error" (RPE) signal, rather than a reward per se. This RPE signaling indicates whether a given reward was either better, equal to, or worse than what was anticipated, and this is believed to be part of a reinforcement learning paradigm. Studies have shown that for learning about a stimulus to occur (so that behavior in response to it changes), the reward has to be surprising or unpredicted. Rewards which are better than predicted reinforce the behavior and cause it to become more frequent, while a reward which is worse than expected would be avoided. Dopamine neurons increase their firing rate when encountering an unexpected reward. After reinforcement learning occurs, dopamine neurons also fire in response to encountering cues in the environment which predicted the reward (e.g. in animal studies, a lever or a special sound). As predictions become updated and the rewards are the same as expected, dopamine activity comparatively diminishes.

"Frustration attraction" (also called the "Romeo and Juliet effect") is the idea that adversity heightens romantic passion, for example, through social or physical barriers. The phenomenon has been remarked on by many authors, such as Socrates, Ovid, the Kama Sutra, and "Dear Abby". Bertrand Russell once opined that "when a man has no difficulty in obtaining a woman, his feeling toward her does not take the form of romantic love". Some common social barriers are parents who interfere with their children's romance (as in Romeo and Juliet), deceived spouses, or other social customs. Helen Fisher believes the phenomenon can be explained by the mechanics of dopamine, because animal studies have shown that when a reward which is anticipated to be incoming is delayed, reward-expecting neurons prolong their firing (over comparatively short timescales—in these studies) until the reward is delivered.

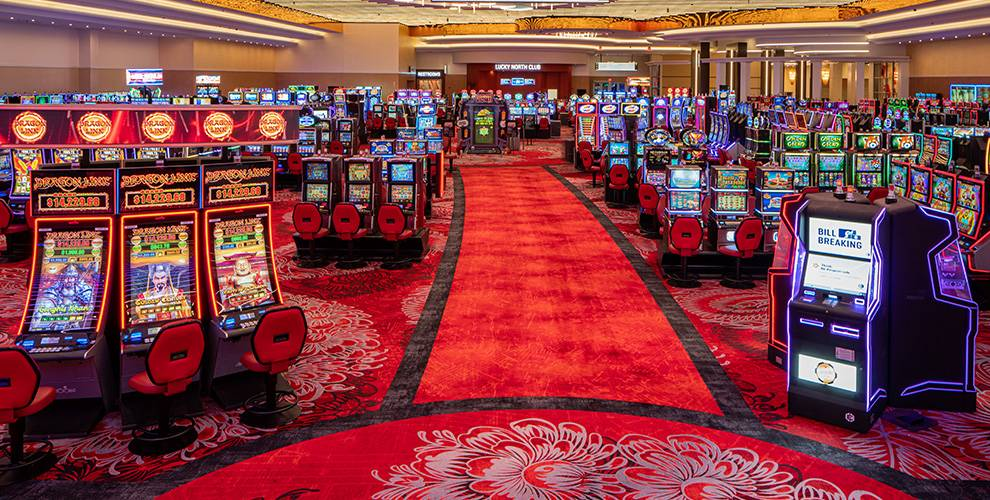

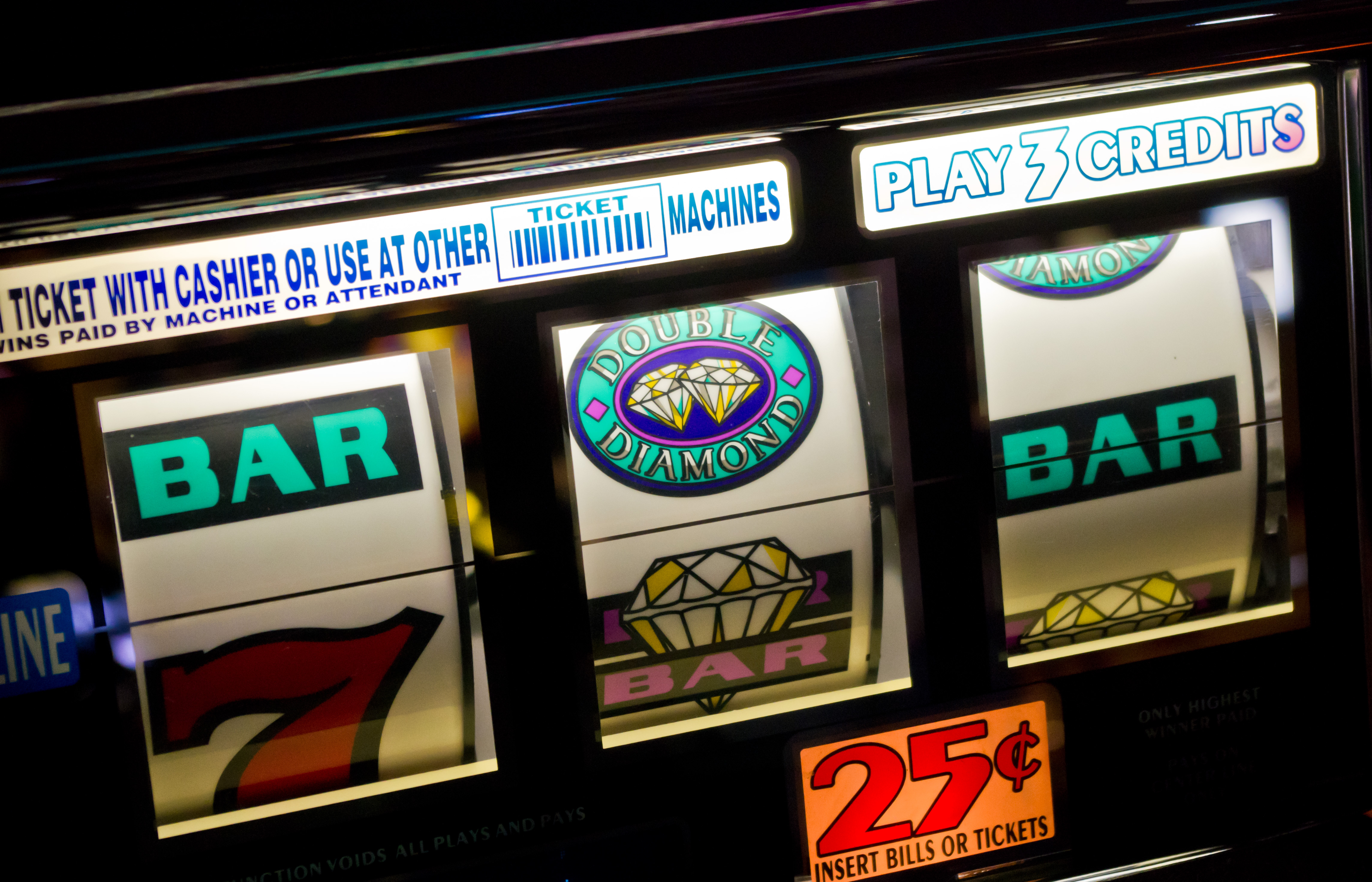
Infatuated love essentially thrives on intermittent reinforcement—also the mechanic a slot machine relies on.

Passionate or infatuated love is also said to thrive in situations which involve the uncertainty of intermittent reinforcement, when consummation is withheld, when barriers prevent lovers from meeting regularly, or when one's perceptions of how likely their love is reciprocated are ambiguous and constantly changing. Uncertainty seems to magnify cue-triggered incentive salience "wanting". A comparable type of situation is that of a slot machine, where the rewards are designed to be always unpredictable so the gambler cannot understand the pattern. Unable to habituate to the experience, for some people the exhilarating high from the unexpected wins leads to gambling addiction and compulsions. If the machine paid out on a regular interval (so that the rewards were expected), it would not be as exciting.

Uncertainty theory in the context of romantic love is associated with Dorothy Tennov's theory of limerence, an addictive, infatuated kind of love, commonly experienced for an unobtainable or unreachable person. In her study, Tennov observed reports of sometimes drastic emotional transitions caused by changes in one's perception over whether their love might be reciprocated, and these abrupt transitions could cause seeming emotional volatility even in otherwise stable individuals. The effect of uncertainty has also been interpreted as attachment anxiety.

Intermittent maltreatment (known as "traumatic bonding" in abusive relationships) is also believed to intensify romantic "passion" (i.e. strong emotion, including suffering). This is, again, believed to be related to intermittent reinforcement and how one's expectations are confirmed or violated. According to Elaine Hatfield, 'Consistency generates little emotion; it is inconsistency that we respond to. If a person always treats us with love and respect, we start to take that person for granted. We like him or her—but "ho hum." [...] What would generate a spark of interest, however, is if our admiring friend suddenly started treating us with contempt—or if our arch enemy started inundating us with kindness.'

=== Positive illusions ===
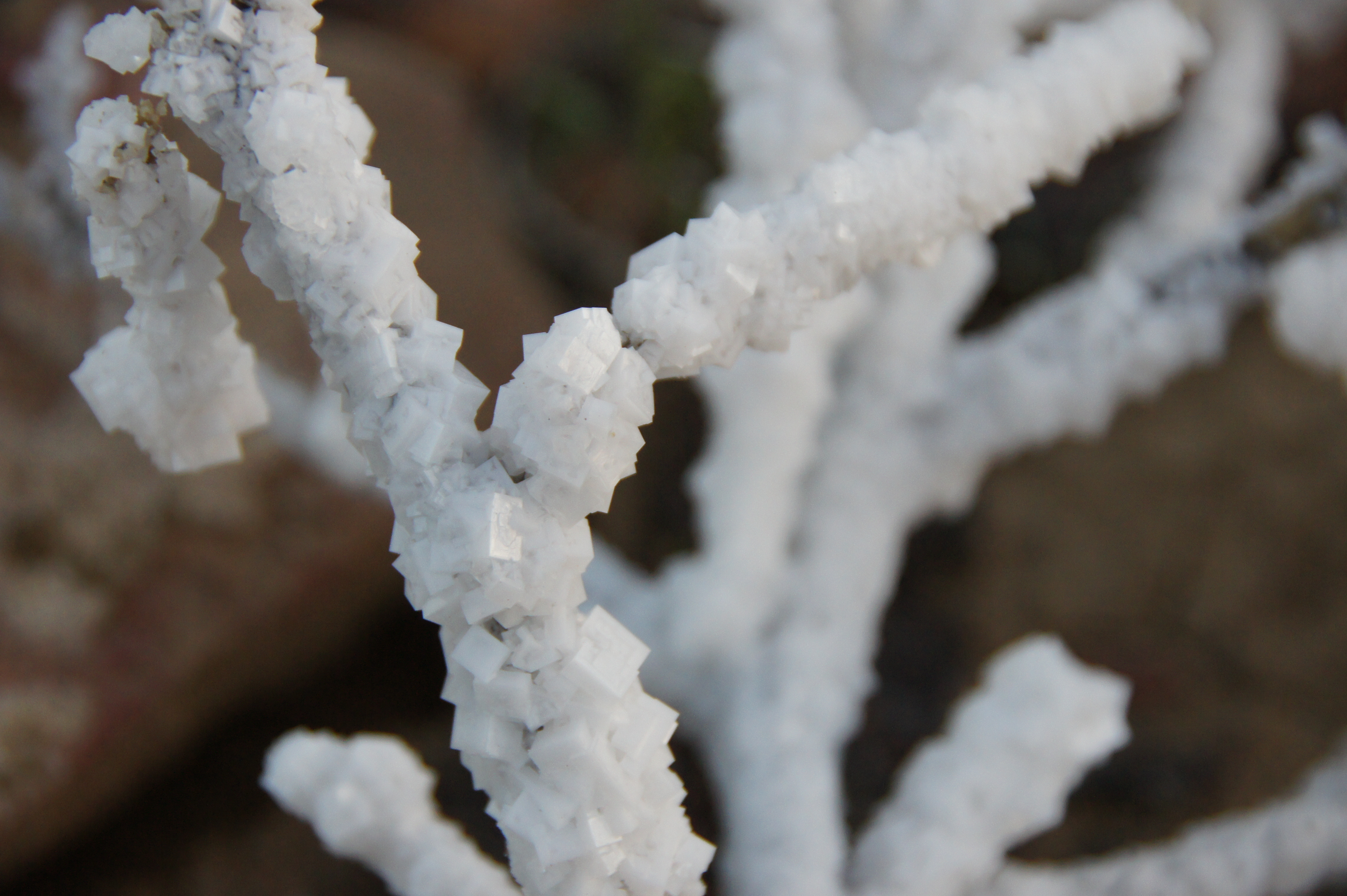
"Crystallization" was coined by the 19th-century French writer Stendhal to refer to these positive illusions, based on an analogy where a tree branch is tossed into a salt mine. The tree branch (or twig) becomes covered in salt crystals, transforming it "into an object of shimmering beauty".

People in love tend to overemphasize the positive aspects of their loved one or relationship, while overlooking or devaluing negative aspects. This is regarded as a type of cognitive bias called positive illusions. The phenomenon has also been referred to as crystallization, idealization, "love is blind" bias, putting the loved one on a pedestal, or seeing through rose-colored glasses. In the past, some authors have depicted the phenomenon as a malady, arguing that people who idealize would have their partner fall short of their high expectations as a relationship progresses; however, despite this, significant modern scientific evidence has shown that positive illusions actually contribute to relationship satisfaction, long-term well-being and decreased risk for relationship discontinuation.

The exact mechanism is not currently understood, but some brain areas are proposed to be related. The dopaminergic areas of the reward system which are active in romantic love may be involved with attributing salience to the positive characteristics of a loved one. The dorsal anterior cingulate cortex is involved with error detection and has been active during negative social evaluation and exclusion, so that reduced activation of this area would be an adaptive response to a partner's negative characteristics. Certain areas of the prefrontal cortex could also be exerting top-down control to suppress emotional responses to attractive alternatives. Information is then passed to the orbitofrontal cortex, where positive and negative information is weighed, resulting in a biased subjective value about the partner.

== Genetics ==
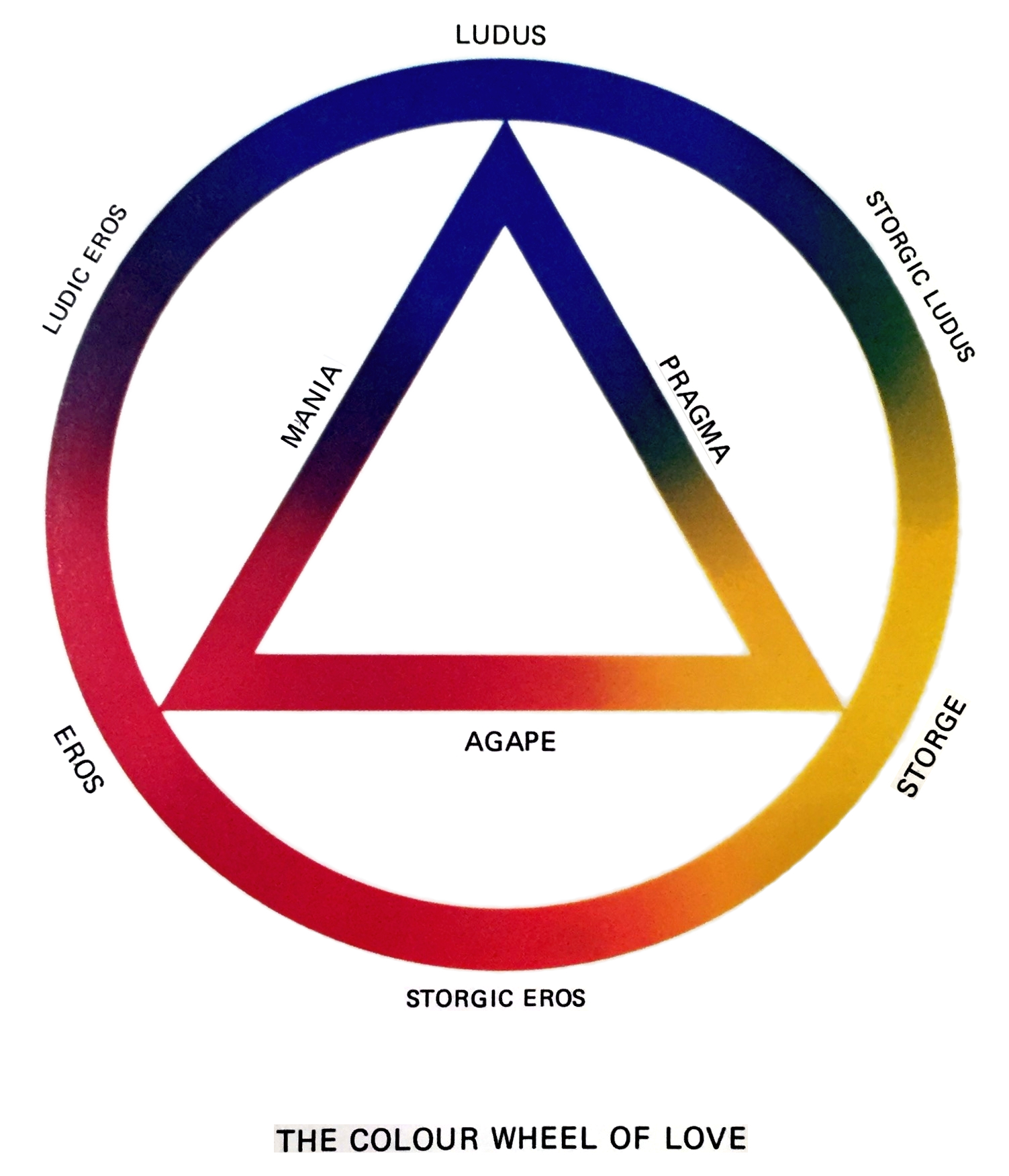

=== Love attitudes ===
Studies have investigated the contribution of genetics to romantic love, using the Love Attitudes Scale (LAS). The LAS is an instrument designed to measure the six "love styles" created by John Alan Lee. The concept of a love style is defined as a way to love another person, or a type of love story. Properly speaking then, the LAS measures love attitudes, which are variables taken to measure the "amount" of each love style in the profile of an individual.

Elaine Hatfield has briefly summarized the six love styles this way:

- Eros: love of beauty.
- Ludus: playful love.
- Storge: companionate love.
- Mania: obsessive love.
- Agape: altruistic love.
- Pragma: realistic love.

Both eros and mania correspond to concepts like falling in love and passionate love.

In 2007, researchers from the University of Pavia led by Enzo Emanuele investigated the relation between love attitudes and the dopamine and serotonin pathways, by examining the association with polymorphisms in several neurotransmitter genes. This study found that the eros love attitude was associated with the DRD2 (dopamine receptor) TaqI A genotypes. A trend was observed in the study for higher scores on eros according to the number of A1 alleles, which has previously been associated with lower DRD2 density. (D2 receptors are inhibitory.) Such a difference is hypothesized to result in a deficiency such that the reward is enhanced from pleasant experiences, consistent with some of the "addictive" features of eros, such as a need for daily contact and a desire for exclusivity. Additionally, the mania love attitude was associated with the 5HT2A (serotonin receptor) C516T genotype, which has also been associated with obsessive–compulsive disorder.

In behavioral genetics, one tool which is valuable for determining genetic influence is the twin study, which compares identical twins (monozygotic, who are genetically identical) and fraternal twins (dizygotic, who are only 50% genetically related, like other siblings). The differences between the two types of twins are used to estimate how much of a given trait is heritable (how much the individual differences in a group, i.e. variance, can be accounted for by genetic differences between individuals), and how much is environmental. Environmental contribution is further split between shared environment (which makes family members more similar) and nonshared environment (which makes them different, but for mathematical reasons also includes measurement error).

In 1994, a twin study co-authored by Phillip Shaver investigated the genetic and environmental influence on love attitudes. This study found that individual differences in love attitudes are almost exclusively due to environmental influence, with genetic factors having very little influence for most love attitudes (from most-to-least heritable: mania, storge, pragma & eros), and even no influence at all for others (ludus & agape). The authors interpret the result as meaning that love styles may be influenced by one's childhood familial environment (for shared environment) and unique experiences with parents, peers, adolescent and adult lovers, and so on (for nonshared environment). Of these, the influence from the nonshared environment was larger than the shared environment.

== Brain imaging ==
Brain imaging techniques such as functional magnetic resonance imaging (fMRI) and positron emission tomography (PET) have been used to investigate which brain regions are involved in romantic love. Nearly all of these experiments have had participants look at a photograph of their beloved during an fMRI scan, with a few exceptions, although the specific procedures used have not always been identical. The differences in experimental design (e.g. length of time the participants had been in love, or the specific task given to participants during the scan) can be used to explain why the experiment results are sometimes different.

In 2000, a study by Andreas Bartels and Semir Zeki of University College London was the first fMRI study of romantic love. The 17 participants were "truly, deeply and madly in love", had been together for a mean of 2.4 years, and were shown either one or two photographs of their loved one during the scan. Two main areas were active in this study: the middle insular cortex, associated with stomach churning or "gut feelings", which could have something to do with the feeling of "butterflies in the stomach", and part of the anterior cingulate cortex, associated with feelings of euphoria. Other activations were areas in the cerebrum, the caudate nucleus, putamen and the cerebellum. A later analysis in 2004 by the same authors also reports activity in the ventral tegmental area (VTA), which produces dopamine. The study also showed key deactivations, areas of the brain that were less active in romantic love compared to friendship love, in the amygdala and medial prefrontal cortex (mPFC). The amygdala is involved with fear and risk detection, and the mPFC is involved with understanding and predicting the intentions of other people, called mentalizing. These deactivations are taken as evidence that "love is blind", or i.e. that people in love discount the risks involved and misunderstand people's intentions, even leading to folly sometimes.

In 2005, a study by Arthur Aron, Helen Fisher, Debra Mashek, Greg Strong, Haifang Li, and Lucy Brown was the first fMRI study of early-stage intense romantic love. It has been praised as advancing the scientific understanding of infatuated love, even by a skeptic of fMRI literature. This study differed from Bartels and Zeki in that the 17 participants who had "just fallen madly in love" had been in love for a much shorter mean time of only 7.4 months. These participants were more intensely in love, and spent 85% or more of their waking hours thinking of their loved one. This study also had participants look at a photograph of their loved one during the scan. Reward and motivation areas were active, like the VTA and areas of the caudate. Activity was also found in the insular and cingulate cortex, involved with emotion. Some interesting areas were correlated with the length of the relationship, like the ventral pallidum, implicated in attachment in prairie voles, and the anterior cingulate, implicated in obsessive thinking, cognition and emotion. This study also examined correlations with facial attractiveness to determine that the right VTA was active because of romantic passion rather than because the partner was aesthetically pleasing. Aesthetically pleasing faces elicited more activity in the left VTA, which is more associated with "liking" a reward (i.e. pleasure), whereas the right VTA is more associated with "wanting" a reward (i.e. incentive salience). In 2011, Xu et al. repeated the experiment by Aron et al., but using Chinese participants.

Ortigue et al. used fMRI to investigate the subliminal influence of romantic love on motivation, interested in how these implicit neural representations might differ from previous experiments where subjects were consciously aware of the stimulus (viewing a photograph). In Ortique et al.'s study, participants were shown a subliminal prime word for 26ms (either their beloved's name, the name of a friend, or a word describing a personal passion like a hobby), followed by a series of symbols (#) for 150ms, followed by a target word for 26ms. This target was either an English word, non-word or blank, and participants were asked to identify whether it was a word or not. In trials with the love prime or passion prime, participants were faster to identify whether the target was a word or not, and this also correlated with scores on the Passionate Love Scale. The authors believe this shows that love priming activates motivation systems in the brain, rather than just evoking a particular emotion. The fMRI scanning showed brain regions active for love primes similar to previous experiments, including reward and motivation areas like the VTA and caudate, but with some additions. Subliminal love priming additionally activated the bilateral fusiform gyri and angular gyri, involved in integrating abstract representations. The authors relate this to the self-expansion model of interpersonal relationships, where self-expansion by integrating the characteristics of one's beloved into one's self (called inclusion of the other in the self) is a rewarding experience which may promote romantic love feelings.

In brain scans of long-term intense romantic love (involving subjects who professed to be "madly" in love, but were together with their partner 10 years or more) led by Bianca Acevedo, attraction similar to early-stage romantic love was associated with dopamine reward center activity ("wanting"), but long-term attachment was associated with the globus palludus, a site for opiate receptors identified as a hedonic hotspot ("liking"). Long-term romantic lovers also showed lower levels of obsession compared to those in the early stage.

An fMRI study led by Sandra Langeslag investigated the effect of attention on brain activity related to a loved one. In most other previous experiments, subjects only passively viewed a photograph, but this experiment used an oddball task to distinguish between instances where the loved one was either the intended target of the subject's attention or a distraction. Participants were given trials where they were presented with a random face for only 250ms (usually an unknown person) and instructed to watch for either a loved one or a friend, then press a button if the face was the intended target for a given run. In some runs, the loved one would be the intended target for a button press, while the friend would be a distractor causing participants to press the button by mistake sometimes, while in other runs the friend would be the target and the loved one a distractor. This experiment found that activity in the dorsal striatum (an area of the reward system) was modulated by whether or not participants were instructed to pay attention to their loved one. That is, the dorsal striatum showed more response to the loved one than to the friend, but only when the loved one was the target. This led the authors to conclude that "the dorsal striatum is not activated by beloved-related information per se, but only by beloved-related information that is attended". This activity also tended to be smaller when participants had been in love or been in a relationship for longer. The dorsal striatum is implicated in reinforcement learning, so the authors interpret the increase in brain activity as reflecting prior reinforcement of social actions which leads the infatuated individuals to pay preferential attention to their loved one. Participants also tended to press the button by mistake more often when distracted by the loved one than the friend.

Some brain scan experiments of early-stage romantic love have found activation of the posterior cingulate cortex, which is implicated in autobiographical memory of socially relevant stimuli (e.g. partner names) and attention. Most experiments (including long-term romantic love) have shown activity in the hippocampus and parahippocampal gyrus, areas involved with learning and memory.

Brain imaging studies on romantic love
Year	Authors	Description	Time in love/in relationship	Stimuli
2000	Bartels & Zeki	Passionate love in relationships	2.4 years (mean)	Pictures
2004	Najib et al.	Grief after rejection	Within 6 weeks after separation, after relationship at least 6 months	Rumination
2005	Aron et al.	Early-stage intense passionate love in relationships	7.4 months (mean)	Pictures
2007	Ortigue et al.	Passionate love in relationships	15.3 months (mean)	Names
2009	Kim et al.	Passionate love in relationships, retested 180 days later	Not more than 100 days	Pictures
2010	Fisher et al.	Intense passionate love after rejection	63 days post-rejection, after 21-month relationship (averages)	Pictures
2010	Younger et al.	Early-stage intense passionate love in relationships, with pain reduction measure	<9 months in relationship	Pictures
2010	Zeki & Romaya	Passionate love in heterosexual and homosexual relationships	3.7 years (mean)	Pictures
2011	Acevedo et al.	Long-term intense passionate love	Married 10–29 years	Pictures
2011	Stoessel et al.	Passionate love in happy relationships, and unhappy after separation	Maximum 6 months	Pictures
2011	Xu et al.	Early-stage intense passionate love in relationships (Chinese)	6.54 months (mean)	Pictures
2012	Xu et al.	Intense passionate love in relationships (Chinese men who are smokers)	14.22 months (mean)	Pictures
2012	Acevedo et al.	Marital satisfaction in long-term passionate love relationships	Married 21.4 years (mean)	Pictures
2012	Poore et al.	Reward prediction error in long-term relationships	53 months (mean) in relationship	Gain/Loss
2013	Yin et al.	Gender differences in perception of romance situations described in text	18.42 months (mean)	Rating task
2013	Scheele et al.	Intranasal oxytocin enhanced brain reward activity and facial attractiveness of partner	28.8 months, 36.4 months (means)	Pictures
2014	Langeslag et al.	Attention modulates dorsal striatum response to a loved one in a distraction task	<9 months in love	Pictures
2015	Song et al.	Resting-state comparison of in-love with those in recently ended relationships and those never in love	12 months in love vs. 10 months post-breakup after 15 months in relationship (means)	Rest
2015	Takahashi et al.	Early-stage passionate love in relationships (this is the only study in the list that used PET instead of fMRI)	17 months (median)	Pictures
2018	Yin et al.	Sex differences in the appraisal of photographs depicting romance scenes (not a partner)	8.76 months (mean)	Pictures
2020	Wang et al.	Brain network organization measured with resting-state fMRI and graph theory	12.23 months (mean)	Rest
2020	Acevedo et al.	Genetic correlates of romantic love and relationship satisfaction among newlyweds	In relationships 4 years (mean), recently or soon to be married, retested after 1 year	Pictures

== See also ==
- Attachment theory – Psychological ethological theory
- Biology and sexual orientation – Field of sexual orientation research
- Effects of hormones on sexual motivation
- Interpersonal attraction – Study of the attraction between people that leads to friendship or romance
- Passionate and companionate love – Two basic love feelings
- Reward theory of attraction – Mechanics of liking and romantic love
- Romance – Love focused on feelings
- Theories of love – Psychological and sociological theories
