= Andreas Bartels =

Swiss neuroscientist and vision researcher

Andreas Bartels is a Swiss professor of neuroscience and vision. Bartels has a PhD in the neurobiology of vision from University College London, and is currently the head of the vision and cognition lab at the University of Tübingen. Bartels also performed a fellowship at the Max Planck Institute for Biological Cybernetics.

Bartels' main focus of neuroscience research is the visual system, but his most cited works are his fMRI experiments with Semir Zeki investigating the biology of romantic love (also called passionate love). In 2000, Bartels & Zeki published the first brain scan experiment of romantic love. In 2004, Bartels & Zeki published another study comparing their scans of romantic love with new fMRI scans of maternal love, demonstrating a similarity.
