= Passionate and companionate love =

Two basic love feelings

In psychology, a distinction is often made between two basic types of love:

- Passionate love, also called romantic love and infatuation, is "a state of intense longing for union with another. Reciprocated love (union with the other) is associated with fulfillment and ecstasy; unrequited love (separation) is associated with emptiness, anxiety, or despair", and "the overwhelming, amorous feeling for one individual that is typically most intense during the early stage of love (i.e., when individuals are not (yet) in a relationship with their beloved or are in a new relationship)".
- Companionate love, also called attachment, is "the affection we feel for those with whom our lives are deeply entwined", and "the comforting feeling of emotional bonding with another individual that takes some time to develop, often in the context of a romantic relationship".

Evolutionary theories state that these two types of love have different purposes, and scientific research suggests they follow somewhat different mechanics. Both passionate and companionate love can contribute to relationship satisfaction.

Passionate love is commonly referred to as "romantic love", especially in biology; however, "passionate love" is most common in psychology. The meaning of "romantic love" is more complicated to define, because of its cultural history and other connotations. Academic literature on love has never adopted a unified terminology. Other terms associated under the heading of passionate love are being "in love", having a crush, lovesickness, obsessive love, limerence and eros.

Companionate love has been compared to strong liking, friendship love, and the "attachment system" from attachment theory, but contention exists over these relations.

A further category distinguishable from these includes compassionate love, agape and unconditional love: that of love focused on caring about others.

== Passionate love ==
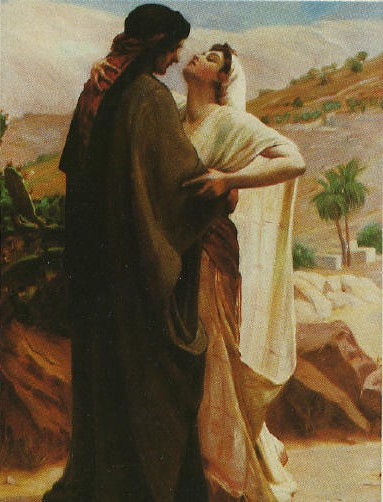
Passionate Encounter, by Frederick Goodall

Passionate love feelings are most commonly measured by psychologists with a questionnaire called the Passionate Love Scale (PLS). In the PLS form, Elaine Hatfield & Susan Sprecher specify the components of passionate love as:

1. Cognitive
  1. Intrusive thinking; preoccupation with the thoughts of the partner.
  2. Idealization of the loved one and the relationship.
  3. Desire for knowledge: to know and be known by the partner.
2. Emotional
  1. Attraction to the other; pleasant feelings for the other when things go well.
  2. Ambivalence or negative feelings (emptiness, anxiety, despair) when things go awry.
  3. Longing for reciprocity.
  4. Desire for "complete union," permanency.
  5. Physiological (sexual) arousal.
3. Behavioral
  1. Actions aimed at determining the other's feelings.
  2. Serving and helping the other.

Passionate love is linked to passion, as in intense emotion, for example, joy and fulfillment, but also anguish and agony. Hatfield notes that the original meaning of passion "was agony—as in Christ's passion." Rather than being an emotion itself, passionate love is said to be a motivational state which produces different emotions depending on the situation (e.g. joy when requited, and sadness when unrequited).

Passionate love is said to be present (or the most intense) when a relationship is new, or before a relationship has started.

== Companionate love ==
La Promenade, by Pierre-Auguste Renoir

Companionate love is less intense than passionate love, and feels more like gentle affection when things are going well in a relationship. Companionate love is also linked to intimacy, and Hatfield suggests intimate relationships have these characteristics:

- Cognitive. Intimates are willing to reveal themselves to one another. They disclose information about themselves and listen to their partners' confidences. In deeply intimate relationships, friends and lovers feel free to reveal most facets of themselves in all their complexities and contradictions. [...]
- Emotional. Intimates care deeply about one another. In passionate love, people usually long for intimacy; in companionate love people usually have it. It is in intimate relationships that people feel most intensely; they love their intimates more than anyone else. [...]
- Behavioral. Intimates are comfortable in close proximity. They gaze at one another, lean on one another, stand close to one another, and perhaps touch.

Companionate love is more about long-term relationships; as such, partner compatibility is emphasized as important. Ellen Berscheid says that companionate love might be "the staff of life for many relationships" (rather than passionate love), and more beneficial to marital satisfaction.

== Relation to other concepts ==
Passionate and companionate love, as envisioned by Elaine Hatfield, was an attempt to unify a variety of different taxonomies, based on a recurring distinction identified by her. The headings are intentionally broad, and subsume many of the differences found in more precise taxonomies. For example, among the love styles developed by John Alan Lee, Hatfield considers both eros and mania under "passionate love", and both storge and pragma under "companionate love". Later research identified issues with this broad classification.

Passionate and companionate love are also referred to by researchers using the terms "infatuation" (for passionate love) and "attachment" (for companionate love). However, these terms carry other connotations, and there is contention over their relation.

=== Infatuation ===
Colloquially, infatuation suggests irrationality and capriciousness. "Infatuation" is sometimes contrasted with "love" in a "love versus infatuation" distinction, although it has been argued this kind of distinction is semantic. According to Elaine Hatfield:

The solution to the love-versus-infatuation riddle seems to be, quite simply, that there is no difference. Psychologists have become increasingly skeptical that passionate love and infatuation differ in any way—at the time one is experiencing them.

Hatfield says that "romantic love" is used by lovers for relationships which are still in progress, and "infatuation" for relationships which become terminated; the distinction might therefore be only identifiable in hindsight. When parents or friends say somebody is "just infatuated" also, they are actually just expressing disapproval.

In the triangular theory of love, by Robert Sternberg, "infatuation" refers specifically to romantic passion in the absence of intimacy and commitment, which departs from Hatfield's idea that there is no difference. Sternberg has likened his idea of infatuation to limerence.

=== Attachment theory ===
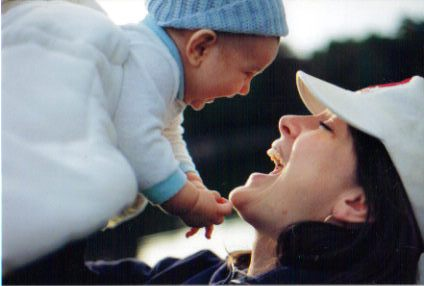
Mother with child

In its original conception by Elaine Hatfield, companionate love is compared to liking (or affection), with the only real difference being the depth of one's feelings and degree of their involvement. Passionate love is distinguished from these as a state of longing and arousal, which does not seem to follow the laws of liking (for example, seemingly being amplified by negative emotion).

As attachment theory became a prominent framework for explaining adult pair bonds, a contention arose among researchers over how passionate and companionate love relate to the "attachment system" from attachment theory. The attachment system was originally conceived of by John Bowlby as a system evolved to keep infants in proximity of their caregiver (or "attachment figure"). The child uses the attachment figure as a "secure base" to feel safe exploring the environment, seeks proximity with the attachment figure when threatened, and suffers distress when separated. A prominent theory suggests this system is reused for adult pair bonds, as an evolutionary exaptation or co-option, whereby a given trait takes on a new purpose. Adults in romantic or intimate relationships exhibit attachment behaviors with their partners (e.g. proximity seeking, safe haven, separation distress, etc.) which are similar to children with their parents.

In a version of this theory from romantic love researchers in the 2000s, the attachment system became synonymous with companionate love, as in Helen Fisher's popular theory of independent emotion systems. A different opinion, by Ellen Berscheid in 2010, also considered companionate love in its original sense (of strong liking or friendship). According to Berscheid, whether all adult relationships are "attachments" in the sense meant by attachment theory was unproven, and such an assumption was "in dire need of empirical scrutiny."

Initially, it was believed that an attachment bond takes about two years to form, and that such attachment functions play little to no role in new relationships until this occurs. However, later research indicated that the attachment system is in fact active during the early stage of romantic love. A series of studies by Paul Eastwick and Eli Finkel demonstrated that attachment anxiety motivated proximity seeking, with behaviors directed towards relationship formation, even in study participants who were not in a relationship. Furthermore, this "partner-specific" attachment anxiety was distinguishable from the anxious attachment style, and it was associated with an increase in passionate love. The attachment system is also believed to be associated with oxytocin, which has been found circulating in people experiencing the early stage of romantic love.

A newer theory then states that passionate love also involves the attachment system, but with additional brain systems for its other features (intense attraction, obsessive thinking, and so on). A further implication is that passionate love is actually distinct or independent from sexual desire. If passionate love was co-opted, then its evolutionary antecedent did not involve a sexual preference (i.e., parents should not only bond with an opposite-sex child). This is used to explain, for example, instances of "platonic" infatuations (without sexual desire) between schoolgirls, and romantic friendships between otherwise heterosexual men.

=== Friendship ===
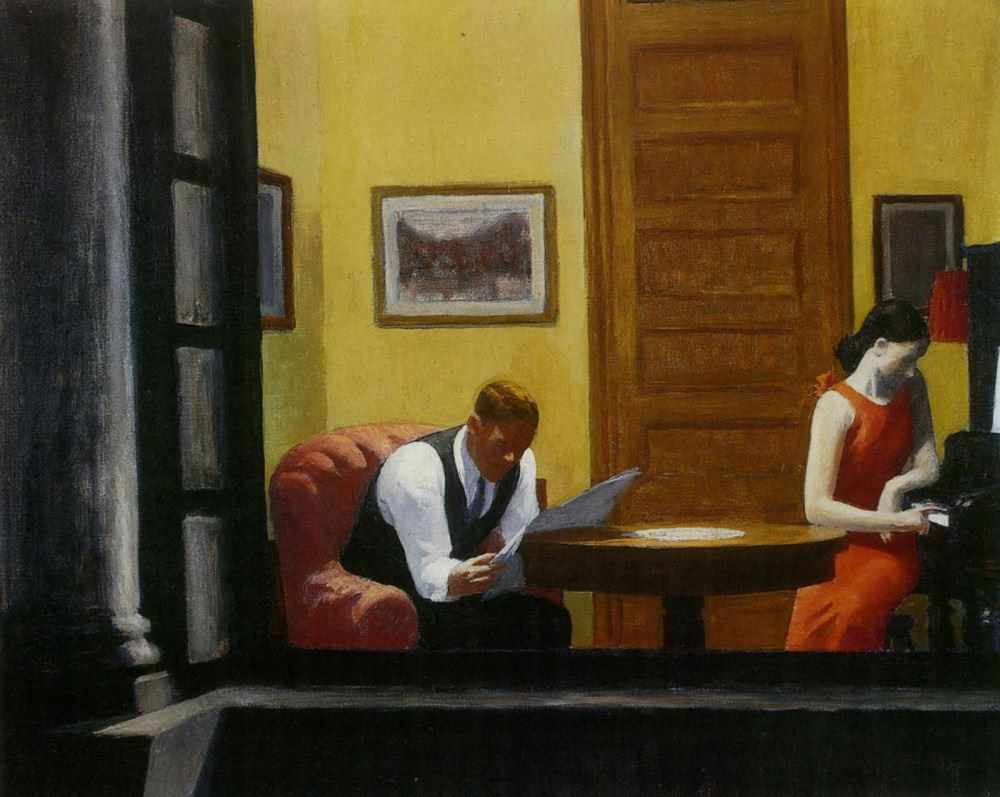
Room in New York, by Edward Hopper

A further contention is how companionate love relates to friendship. For example, historically, the love styles storge and pragma have been labeled as companionate love. Of these, storge is named after the Ancient Greek "storge", and refers to a relationship style in which love grows out of a special friendship, or at least mutual activities shared between the sort of people who could have been old friends. A more passionate lover might consider storge to be "just friendship or affection, not love". In pragma, a partner is chosen based more on demographic or personality traits, and shared activities are more of a means to an end.

A different definition comes from the triangular theory of love, by Robert Sternberg, where "companionate love" refers to features of intimacy and commitment in the absence of passion. (With the addition of passion, it becomes labeled "consummate love".)

In light of this, a meta-analytic factor analysis found that the love attitudes for storge and pragma did not align with intimacy and commitment from the Triangular Love Scale, but rather on a separate factor of their own (labeled "practical friendship"). Intimacy and commitment aligned on a general love factor, along with measures such as passion and Zick Rubin's liking scale. Therefore, it is concluded that while practical friendship has some aspects of companionate love, the two can be considered distinct.

=== Obsessive and harmonious passion ===
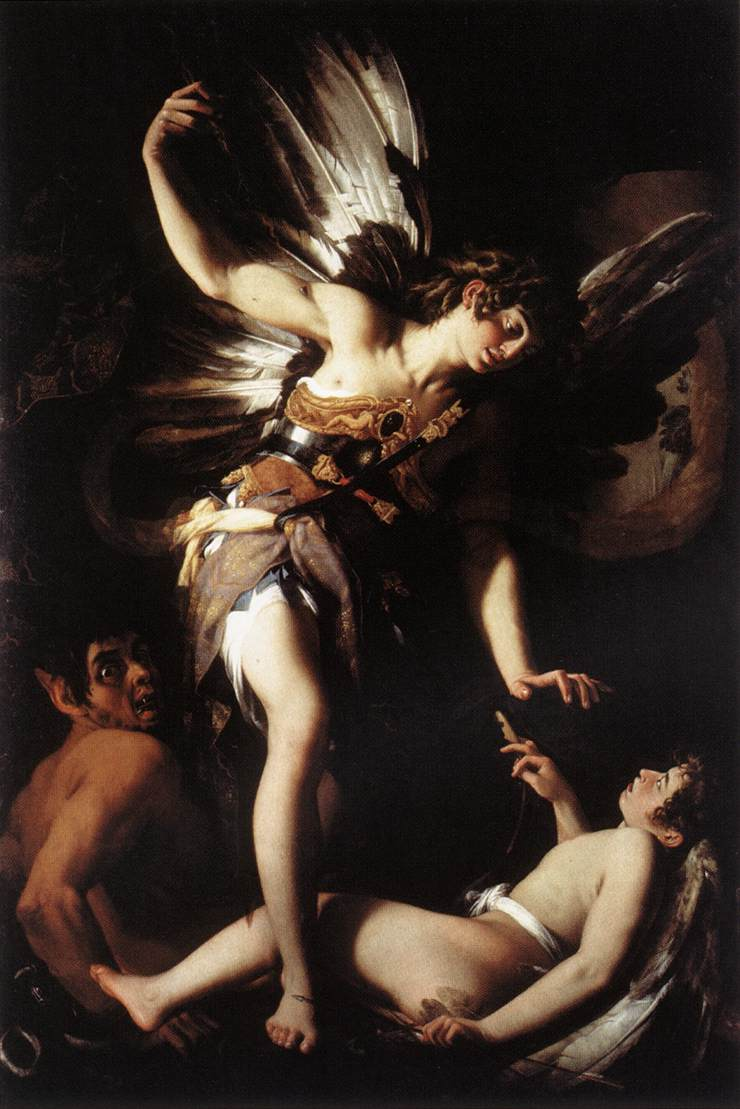
Divine Love Conquering Earthly Love, by Giovanni Baglione.

Research has identified issues with the notion that romantic passion only takes a single form, as was assumed in Elaine Hatfield's original conception of passionate love. The dualistic model of passion (DMP) is a theory invented by the psychologist Robert Vallerand which suggests that passion can be split into two components, termed "obsessive" and "harmonious" passion:

- In obsessive passion, a person's passion is driven by internal pressure, controlling them and interfering with other aspects of their life.
- In harmonious passion, the person experiencing it retains their autonomy, and their passion is more in harmony with other life domains.

DMP has been extended to romantic passion, with a study finding that harmonious romantic passion was associated with secure attachment, while obsessive romantic passion was associated with anxious attachment. One issue addressed by the model is the idea that passion is either positive or negative based on whether it's reciprocated or not (as in Hatfield's conception of passionate love), because this ignores the possibility of negative outcomes occurring inside a relationship. Negative relationship outcomes are proposed to be mainly associated with obsessive passion.

Research on the Passionate Love Scale (PLS) by Bianca Acevedo and Arthur Aron found that while it was intended as a unidimensional measure of love feelings, it actually has two general components (called factors): an obsession factor and a non-obsession factor. The PLS obsession factor has items like "Sometimes I feel I can't control my thoughts; they are obsessively on my partner." and "An existence without my partner would be dark and dismal." The non-obsession factor has items like "For me, my partner is the perfect romantic partner." and "I want my partner—physically, emotionally, and mentally."

According to a meta-analysis by Acevedo & Aron, romantic love with and without obsession (using the PLS) have slightly different trajectories in a relationship. Romantic love with obsession was more associated with satisfaction in short-term relationships than long-term, whereas the associations between satisfaction and romantic love without obsession were similar and large for both short-term and long-term groups. Additionally, it was found that romantic love may sustain over a longer period than previously assumed, but without the obsessional features. Another meta-analysis found that the mania love attitude was associated with decreased satisfaction, as it continues over time in a relationship.

This line of research and theory has also been used to explain the differences between other concepts which have all been considered under the heading of "passionate love". The love styles called passionate love by Hatfield are distinguished this way: mania (obsessive) and eros (harmonious). Taken together, eros and mania correspond to the way passionate love is operationalized on the PLS. "Limerence" is also a term invented by the psychologist Dorothy Tennov to refer to the state of being in love, particularly when it takes the form of obsessive passion. An issue raised by Tennov in her research was the tendency for people to use terms like "passionate love" while referring to ways of being in love which are actually quite different.

=== Infatuation and Attachment Scales ===
Following the research by Bianca Acevedo and Arthur Aron which revealed issues with the Passionate Love Scale, the researcher Sandra Langeslag designed the Infatuation and Attachment Scales (IAS) to measure more distinct components of love. According to Langeslag, infatuation and attachment are comparable to passionate and companionate love.

The Infatuation Scale (compared to passionate love) has items about:

- Staring into the distance while thinking of the beloved.
- Getting shaky knees while in the presence of the beloved.
- Feelings for the beloved reducing one's appetite.
- Thoughts about the beloved making it difficult to concentrate.
- Being afraid that one will say something wrong while talking to the beloved.
- Getting clammy hands while near the beloved.
- Becoming tense while close to the beloved.
- Having a hard time sleeping because of thinking about the beloved.
- Searching for alternate meanings in the beloved's words.
- Being shy in the presence of the beloved.

The Attachment Scale (compared to companionate love) has items about:

- Feeling that one can count on the beloved.
- Being prepared to share one's possessions with the beloved.
- Feeling lonely without the beloved.
- Feeling that the beloved is the one for them.
- The beloved knowing everything about them.
- Hoping one's feelings for the beloved never end.
- Feeling emotionally connected to the beloved.
- The beloved being able to reassure them when they are upset.
- The beloved being the person who can make them feel the happiest.
- The beloved being part of their plans for the future.

Using the IAS, Langeslag et al. found that infatuation is more associated with negative emotion than attachment, and tends to decrease after entering a relationship. Participants who were not in a relationship scored the highest on infatuation.

== Temporal theory ==
Passionate love has been considered to encompass certain cases of love at first sight; however, this is not believed to be prototypical, and not everyone falls in love quickly or suddenly. In one study of Chinese and American participants, 38% fell in love fast and 35% fell in love slowly; in another study of Iranians, 70% fell in love slowly or very slowly.

Several estimates exist for the duration of passionate love: 18 months to 3 years, 12 to 18 months, or only just about a year. However, in the phenomenon of long-term intense romantic love, romantic feelings have been shown to sustain in some couples for a longer period, but with less of the obsessional features of passionate love.

Companionate love is thought to build over time as a relationship progresses, but then decrease very slowly over the course of several decades. There is some reason to think attachment takes about two years to develop. A study found that participants who had been in a relationship for about this long named their romantic partner as an attachment figure, while other participants named a parent. In the past, some have thought companionate love to be stable after it develops, but for example, one study of new marriages found a decline after a 1-year period.

A popular hypothesis suggests that passionate love turns into companionate love over time in a relationship, but other accounts suggest that while companionate love takes longer to develop, it is important at the beginning of a relationship as well. Companionate love might also precede passionate love in certain cases.

== Causal theory ==
Passionate and companionate love are/were believed to follow different mechanics.

=== Emotional arousal ===
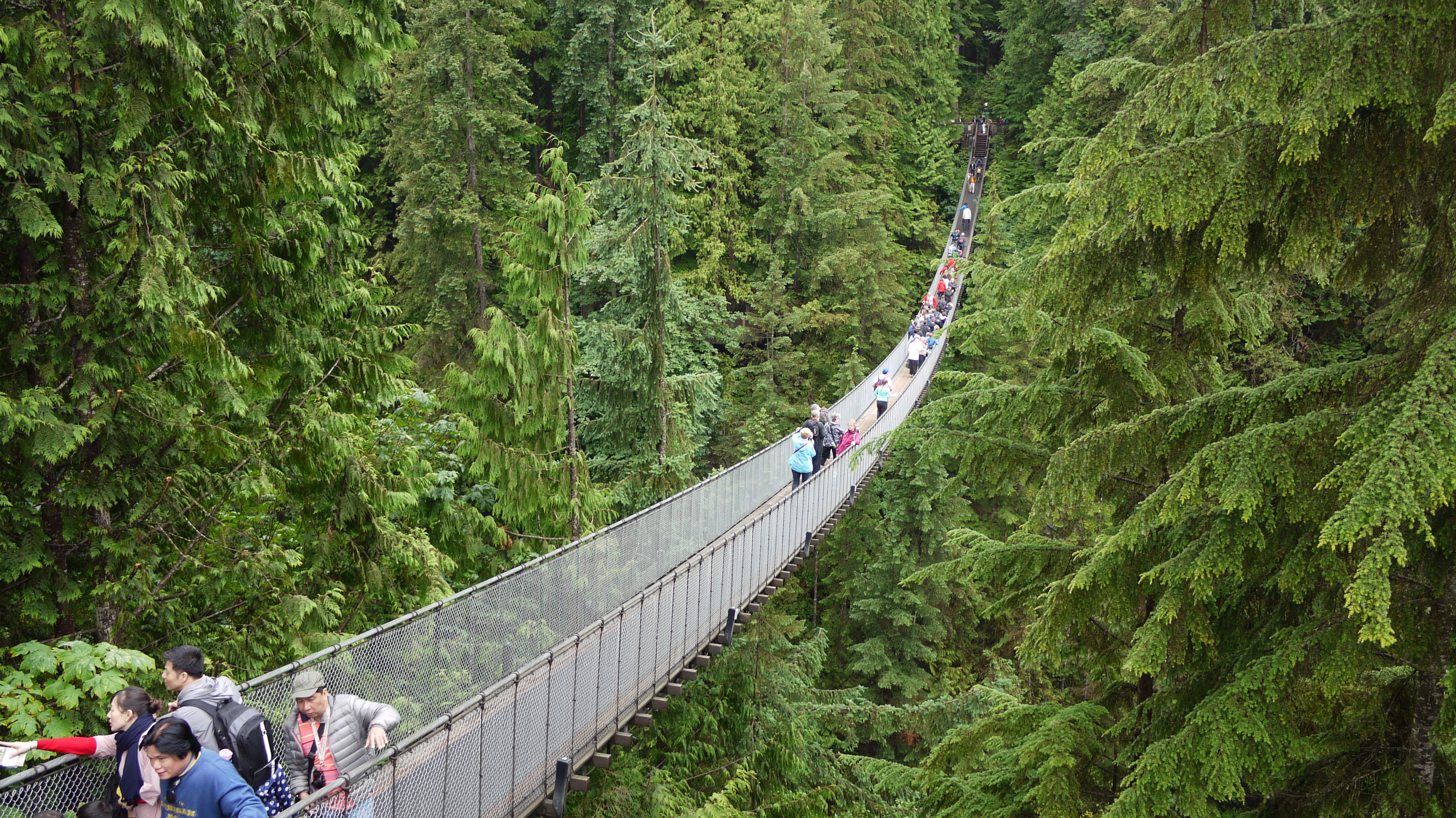
The Capilano Suspension Bridge, where Dutton & Aron's misattribution of arousal experiment was conducted

The earliest scientific theory of passionate love by Ellen Berscheid and Elaine Hatfield relied on the two-factor theory of emotion by Stanley Schachter, which states that for a person to experience emotion, they must: (a) experience physiological arousal, while (b) also having a sense that it would be appropriate to interpret that arousal in emotional terms. Neither arousal nor cognition by themselves would produce emotion, according to the theory.

In experiments by Schacter and Jerome Singer, subjects were told they were testing a new vitamin compound called "Suproxin"; in reality, half were injected with saline, and the other half with epinephrine. Schacter & Singer's data supported their hypothesis that subjects who were injected with epinephrine would have their emotional responses enhanced in situations which were meant to elicit excitement and anger (compared to the saline control group), but only when they were not informed of the effects of the shot. Subjects who were warned beforehand would instead (correctly) attribute their arousal to the drug.

A version of this theory created by Berscheid & Hatfield speculated that when an individual experiences intense arousal (positive or negative) in response to another person, what might be important in determining how the individual feels is how the arousal is labeled: love should be experienced if the situation makes it reasonable to attribute the arousal to passionate love. This received some support from research on misattribution of arousal, such as the classic experiment by Don Dutton and Art Aron in which subjects were more romantically attracted to a female experimenter while standing on a wobbly suspension bridge.

=== Predictors of attraction ===
Companionate love was originally conceived of as a stronger form of liking, which would therefore follow the principles of "attraction" laid out by interpersonal attraction research of the day. Attraction was then often defined to mean more generally a "positive attitude".

This early research identified five major predictors of attraction:

- Similarity, also known as "birds of a feather flock together".
- Propinquity, in other words similarity of location, and also the mere-exposure effect.
- Being liked, which tends to also cause liking in return, called reciprocal liking.
- Matching of admirable characteristics, so people tend to pair with those who have similar attractiveness, called the matching hypothesis.
- Social and cultural influences, which constrain who people are likely to meet, and what is considered attractive or important.

The matching of similar traits through marriage is also called "homogamy"; dissimilarity is "heterogamy".

Another mechanical aspect of companionate love lifted from interpersonal attraction research is the reinforcement model, which states that people like those who reward them and dislike those who punish them. In this view, Hatfield says companionate love is "a steady burning fire, fueled by delightful experiences but extinguished by painful ones".

=== Self-expansion ===
Subsequent to interpersonal attraction research, the self-expansion model was developed by Arthur Aron and Elaine Aron as a variation on reward theory which proposes the type of reward which elicits passionate love. According to the model, people have a basic motivation to expand their physical influence, cognitive complexity, social or bodily identity, and self-awareness, and the psychological reward from falling in love is whatever creates this "expansion of the self".

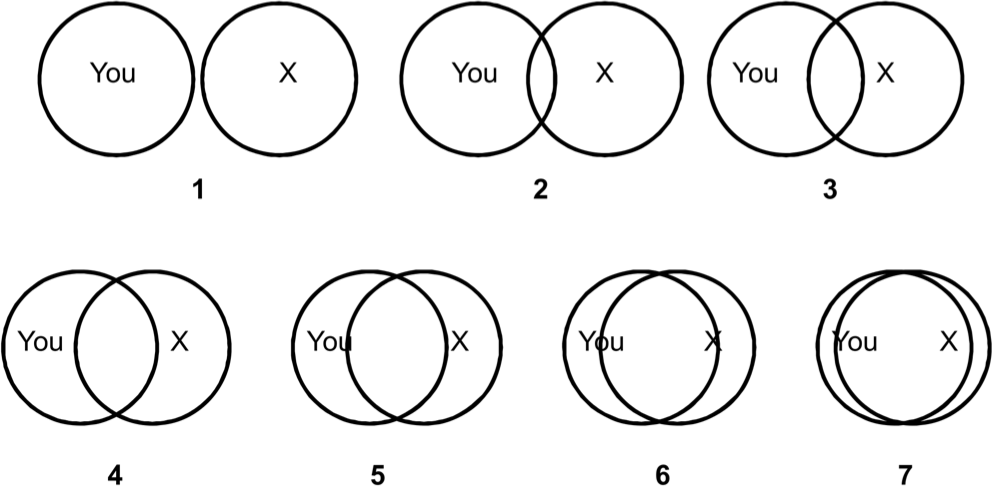
Inclusion of the other in the self (IOS) is typically measured with the IOS Scale.

In the context of relationships, self-expansion occurs via a process called "inclusion of the other in the self", where aspects of a partner (e.g. traits, skills, attitudes, resources, abilities, and worldviews) are incorporated into one's own self concept. Self-expansion can also take the form of having new and exciting experiences with a partner.

According to the Arons' revision of reward theory then, attraction arises when opportunities for self-expansion are perceived. This would take the form of passionate love when the rate of expansion is rapid and approaches its maximum, and companionate love in a more shallow phase.

Furthermore, the Arons propose that attraction according to self-expansion would occur when encountering the opposite of the five predictors identified by interpersonal attraction research. For example, similarity may provide the basis for effective communication or predictability, whereas difference may provide the basis for self-expansion: new challenges, new experiences, new resources, etc. In other words, opposites might attract in certain cases, particularly if reciprocal liking first suggests that a relationship is likely.

=== Uncertainty ===
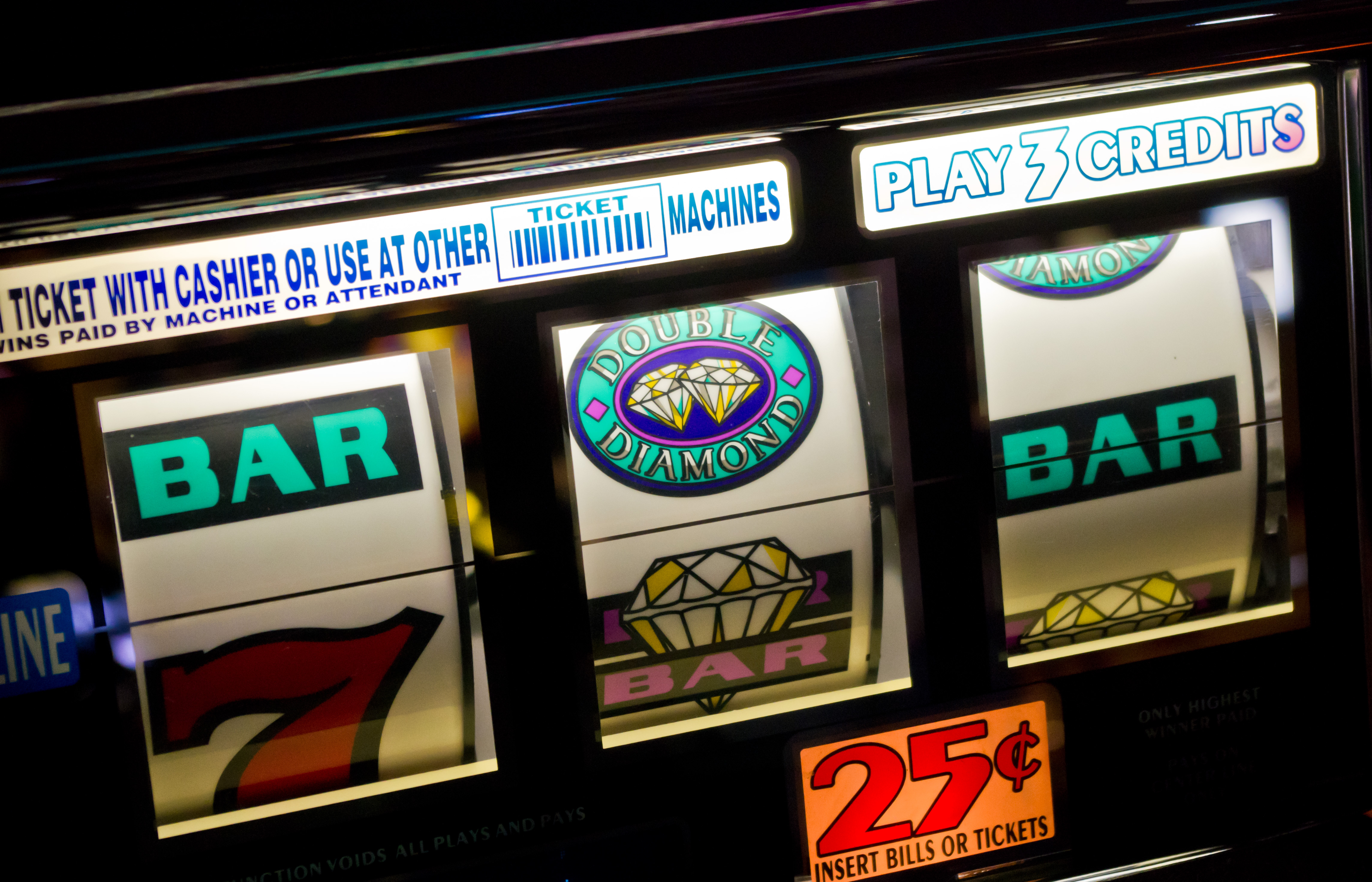
Passionate love essentially thrives under intermittent reinforcement—also the mechanic a slot machine relies on.

Uncertainty is a feature of new or potential relationships, believed to intensify and prolong feelings of passionate love. The phenomenon has been interpreted in terms of intermittent reinforcement, and attachment anxiety. A slot machine involves a comparable situation, where the rewards are designed to be always unpredictable so the gambler cannot understand the pattern. Unable to habituate to the experience, for some people the exhilarating high from the unexpected wins leads to gambling addiction and compulsions. If the machine paid out on a regular interval (so that the rewards were expected), it would not be as exciting.

Paul Eastwick and Eli Finkel argue that attachment anxiety over uncertainty is actually a normative experience during the early period of a romantic relationship, and drives relationship formation. Studies by Eastwick & Finkel found this anxiety to be associated with an increase in passionate love. Surprise and uncertainty tend to be more characteristic of new relationships because established partners behave more as expected, thus more rarely generating such arousal. Using attachment theory, passion can also be said to wane as a relationship becomes more secure. Uncertainty is therefore perpetuated, for example, by confusing and tumultuous on-again-off-again relationships—probably the most likely to sustain passionate love (but not security).

According to Elaine Hatfield, "Consistency generates little emotion; it is inconsistency that we respond to. If a person always treats us with love and respect, we start to take that person for granted. We like him or her—but 'ho hum.' [...] What would generate a spark of interest, however, is if our admiring friend suddenly started treating us with contempt—or if our arch enemy started inundating us with kindness." Such intermittent good-bad treatment is also a feature of traumatic bonding, wherein an abuser treats their victim with alternating phases of punishment (threats, verbal or physical abuse) and relief (promises to change, expressions of love); this unfortunate dynamic seems to actually produce the strongest emotional bonds.

Uncertainty as a driver of passion is also often associated with Dorothy Tennov's theory of limerence.

== Biology ==
Passionate and companionate love are thought to be interrelated; however, they involve different brain systems, and serve different purposes. Passionate love is thought to have evolved for mate choice or to initiate a pair bond, while companionate love is for maintaining a pair bond, maintaining close proximity and affiliative behaviors.

According to a modern model of the brain systems involved with falling in love (or romantic attachment more generally), a variety of neurotransmitters and hormones are involved; for example:

- Oxytocin—associated with bonding, attachment, and social salience.
- Dopamine—associated with incentive salience ("wanting", or desire).
- Endogenous opioids—associated with the hedonic or pleasurable aspect of reward ("liking").

The experience of romantic love is created and maintained by the associated brain systems acting together, in combination.

Research indicates that intense passionate love resembles addiction, but academics do not currently agree on how love addictions are defined. People experiencing passionate love share similar traits with addicts (for example, feeling rushes of euphoria, or craving for their beloved), but with a basic difference that these features of love tend to lessen over time, while the condition of a drug addict tends to worsen. Helen Fisher has proposed that passionate love is a "positive addiction" (i.e. not harmful) when reciprocated and a "negative addiction" when unrequited or inappropriate.

== See also ==
- Attachment theory – Psychological ethological theory
- Biology of romantic love – Evolution and neuroscience of romantic love
- Colour wheel theory of love – Love typology by J. A. Lee
- Falling in love – Process of developing strong feelings of attachment and love
- Infatuation – Intense, irrational attraction
- Interpersonal attraction – Study of the attraction between people that leads to friendship or romance
- Limerence – Love madness or intense infatuation
- Love addiction – Proposed disorder of problematic passion & distress
- Obsessive love – Possessiveness and inability to accept rejection
- Passion (emotion) – Feeling of intense enthusiasm towards or compelling desire for someone or something
- Theories of love – Psychological and sociological theories
- Triangular theory of love – Psychological theory by Robert Sternberg
