= Enzo Emanuele =

Italian pathologist (born 1977)

- Born: 10 June 1977 (age 49); Novara, Italy
- Education: Pavia Medical School: University of Pavia
- Known for: Biomarker discovery, Interdisciplinary research
- Awards: Zdenek Klein Award for Human Ethology (2008), Giovanni Galli Prize for the Study of Atherosclerosis (2009)
- Scientific career
- Fields: Clinical Pathology

Enzo Emanuele (born 10 June 1977) is an Italian clinical pathologist known for his interdisciplinary research in the field of biological psychology. He has studied the biology of romantic love and identified the neurotrophin nerve growth factor (NGF) as a key biochemical mediator of falling in love. The implications of this research have been criticised in the popular press. In 2008, his genetic research, which showed an association between serotonin and dopamine receptor gene polymorphisms and certain love traits, was awarded with the International Zdenek Klein Award for Human Ethology from Charles University in Prague, Czech Republic.

Emanuele is also known for his studies on biomarkers of atherosclerosis. On 3 October 2009, Enzo Emanuele was awarded by the Italian Society for the Study of Atherosclerosis (SISA), Lombardy Section, with the Giovanni Galli Prize for his scientific contributions in the field of cardiovascular biomarkers.

He graduated as MD from the University of Pavia in Pavia, Italy in 2002.

Emanuele is Associate Editor of the journal Atherosclerosis. He is also member of the editorial board of the Journal of Special Education and Rehabilitation.

== Contributions to science ==
- Identification of sRAGE, the soluble form of the receptor for advanced glycation endproducts, as related to atherosclerosis, dementia, and longevity.
- Identification of the neurotrophin nerve growth factor (NGF) as a biochemical mediator of falling in love in humans.
- Genetic dissection of human mating system and love styles.
- Identification of biochemical markers of autism.
- Genetics of sporadic Alzheimer's disease.
- Identification of biochemical markers related to aggressive behaviour in domestic animals.
- Role of serotonin and omega-3 fatty acids in experimental neuroeconomics.
- Researchers led by Dr Enzo Emanuele have traced the genetic component of cellulite to particular polymorphisms in the angiotensin converting enzyme (ACE) and hypoxia-inducible factor 1A (HIF1a) genes.
