= Bianca Acevedo =

Love and sensory processing sensitivity researcher

- Education: New York University (BA); Stony Brook University (PhD)
- Known for: Sensory processing sensitivity; Romantic love
- Scientific career
- Workplaces: University of California, Santa Barbara
- Website: www.biancaacevedo.com

Bianca Acevedo is an American research scientist who studies romantic love and sensory processing sensitivity. Acevedo performed the first neuroimaging study of long-term intense romantic love, couples who were still "madly" in love but had been married for 21 years on average. She is a researcher at Northwell Health, and the University of California, Santa Barbara.

== Career ==
Acevedo received a BA in psychology from New York University, and a PhD in social/health psychology from Stony Brook University.

As a postdoctoral researcher, she conducted a study with Arthur Aron (published in 2009) which found that romantic love can last inside relationships much longer than people generally assume. About 13% of people reported high levels of romantic love in their long-term relationships. In 2011, their brain scan experiment using fMRI was published, of long-term intense romantic lovers who had been in relationships for 10 years or more. These participants showed brain activations in dopamine-rich areas of the reward system (like the ventral tegmental area) when viewing a photograph of their loved one, similar to people in the early stage of romantic love, but also showed lower levels of anxiety compared to early-stage lovers. The early stage of intense romantic love (also called passionate love) has an obsessive element, but people experiencing romantic love in longer-term relationships show lower levels of obsession.

Acevedo has written two books on sensory processing sensitivity, related to the concept of a highly sensitive person:

- Acevedo, Bianca P. (2020-05-20). The Highly Sensitive Brain: Research, Assessment, and Treatment of Sensory Processing Sensitivity. Elsevier Science. ISBN 978-0-12-818251-2.
- Acevedo, Bianca P. (2024-07-25). The Science and Art of Sensory Processing Sensitivity. Elsevier. ISBN 978-0-323-99728-7.

== See also ==
- Arthur Aron
- Elaine Aron
- Helen Fisher (anthropologist)
- Biology of romantic love
