= Richard Rapson =

Professor of American history

Richard L. Rapson (born March 8, 1937, in New York) is professor emeritus of American history at the University of Hawaiʻi at Mānoa.

== Background ==
Rapson earned his B.A. magna cum laude at Amherst College in June 1958, and served briefly there as an instructor in American Studies. He then taught history at Stanford University from 1961 to 1965 while pursuing his Ph.D. at Columbia University, granted in 1966. His dissertation was on The British Traveler in America, 1860–1935; his doctoral advisor was Richard Hofstadter.

In 1966, after teaching history at University of California at Santa Barbara, he moved to Hawaii, and has been on the faculty of the University of Hawaii system ever since. He has returned to Stanford as a Visiting Professor of History (1973–74), and been a Visiting Professor of History four separate semesters on Semester at Sea, a University shipboard program that sails around the world. Rapson worked as a psychotherapist for 15 years, beginning in 1982. He was also named National Finalist for the Danforth Foundation's Distinguished Teaching Award, which honored the nation's best teachers. He founded and headed the University of Hawaii's experimental liberal arts college, New College, from 1968 to 1973.

Rapson has written many books and short stories. Some of these were written with his wife, Dr. Elaine Hatfield. He has one child, Dr. Kim Elizabeth Rapson.

== Notable publications ==
- (1968). Individualism and Conformity in the American Character. Lexington, Mass: D.C. Heath. ISBN 0669448265
- (1971). Britons View America: Travel Commentary, 1860–1935. Seattle: University of Washington Press. ISBN 0295951591
- (1971). The Cult of Youth in Middle-Class America. Lexington, Mass: D.C. Heath. 0669733873
- (1971). Major Interpretations of the American Past. New York: Irvington. ISBN 0390728470
- (1982). Denials of Doubt: An Interpretation of American History. Lanham, Md.: University Press of America. ISBN 0819105414
- (1980). Fairly Lucky You Live Hawaii! Cultural Pluralism in the 50th State. Lanham, Md.: University Press of America. ISBN 0819111678
- (1988). American Yearnings: Love, Money, and Endless Possibility. New York: XLibris. ISBN 0819170895
- (2003). Amazed by Life: Confessions of a Non-Religious Believer. New York: XLibris. ISBN 1401099386
- (2007). Magical Thinking and the Decline of America. New York: XLibris. ISBN 1425771017

Co-Authored with Elaine Hatfield

- (1993). Love, sex, and intimacy: Their psychology, biology, and history. New York: HarperCollins. ISBN 0-06-500702-6
- (1994). Emotional contagion. New York: Cambridge University Press. ISBN 0-521-44948-0
- (1996/2005). Love and sex: Cross-cultural perspectives. Needham Heights, MA: Allyn & Bacon. ISBN 0-205-16103-0 Reprint: Lanham, MD: University Press of America. ISBN 0-7618-3232-7.
- (2020). What's Next in Love and Sex: Psychological and Cultural Perspectives. New York: Oxford University Press, ISBN 978-0-1906-4716-2

== Interviews ==
- Heydeck, Elisabeth. "Erklär mir Liebe—Viel Lärm um Nichts?” ZDF (German Public Television) Science Documentary. 2011.
- Miller, Lulu. "Entanglement." National Public Radio Invisibilia Series. January 30, 2015.
- Roller, Emma. "Donald Trump's Unstoppable Virility." The New York Times. December 29, 2015.
- Sex During Wartime: History Under the Covers – 9-part series (Sex in WWII: The Home Front and Sex in WWII: The European Front). The History Channel. 2002.
