= Elaine Hatfield =

American social psychologist

- Born: October 22, 1937 (age 88); Detroit, Michigan
- Education: University of Michigan (BA, 1959); Stanford University (PhD, 1963)
- Known for: Passionate Love Scale; Passionate and companionate love
- Spouse: Richard Rapson
- Scientific career
- Fields: Social psychology; Interpersonal attraction; Romantic love
- Institutions: University of Wisconsin; University of Hawaii
- Website: www.elainehatfield.com

Elaine Hatfield (formerly also known as Elaine Walster; born October 22, 1937) is an American social psychologist. She has been credited, alongside Ellen Berscheid, as a primary pioneer in the scientific study of love, initially with contributions to the emerging field of interpersonal attraction in the 1960s. The Passionate Love Scale, developed later in 1986 by Hatfield and Susan Sprecher, is one of the most widely used in the field.

She is employed as a professor in the psychology department of the University of Hawaii.

== Education ==
Hatfield received her BA in Psychology and English in 1959 from the University of Michigan and her PhD from Stanford University in 1963.

== Career ==
Relationship science was Hatfield's first professional research focus, beginning at the foundation of her career in the 1960s with an emphasis on human attraction and the nature of romantic love.

In addition to Berscheid, she has conducted this research with a number of colleagues, including Leon Festinger (her dissertation advisor at Stanford University), Elliot Aronson, William Walster, Russell D. Clark, and Susan Sprecher.

Hatfield's research in the area has not been without controversy: in 1975, the $84,000 grant she was awarded by the National Science Foundation became the focus of the first Golden Fleece Award for wasteful government spending by then United States Senator William Proxmire. Due to Proxmire's campaign, the funding was rescinded. Undaunted, Hatfield went on to write or co-write many books and papers based on her research, among them A New Look at Love, which won the American Psychological Foundation's National Media Award, and the often-cited Journal of Psychology and Human Sexuality article "Gender Differences in Receptivity to Sexual Offers" (1989).

In the 1990s, Hatfield and husband, American historian Richard Rapson, began researching emotional contagion: the process by which people's emotions are influenced by the demonstrated emotions of their companions. This resulted in the book, with John Caccioppo, on Emotional Contagion. (Cambridge University Press, 1994). In the 2000s, she presented alongside Katherine Aumer on the psychology of hate.

Hatfield is former chair and professor of psychology at the University of Hawai'i and past president and fellow of the Society for the Scientific Study of Sexuality (SSSS). In 2012, the Association for Psychological Science gave Hatfield the William James award for a Lifetime of Scientific Achievement. In recent years, she has received Distinguished Scientist Awards (for a lifetime of scientific achievement) from the Society of Experimental Social Psychology (SESP), from the SSSS, and from the University of Hawai'i, and she has received the Alfred Kinsey Award from the Western Region of SSSS. Two of her books have won the American Psychological Association's National Media Award.

In 2019, She received three more honors: 1) Methodological Innovator Award from the Society for Personality and Social Psychology; 2) Wall of Fame Award from the Heritage Foundation; and 3) the Lifetime Achievement Award from the International Academy for Intercultural Research.

In 2020, her book on the future of love and sex- What's Next in Love and Sex: Psychological and Cultural Perspectives was published by Oxford University Press.

== Personal life ==
Outside of their research, in 1963, Hatfield and Berscheid, then professors at the University of Minnesota, challenged and overcame the university's prohibition against women on faculty dining in the university's Faculty Club. She is married to the historian Richard Rapson, whom she met in 1982 at the University of Hawaii. Formerly, she was married to G. William Walster, but they divorced.

According to Elaine Hatfield, her father, Charles Hatfield, was of the Hatfield family "of Hatfield and McCoy fame".

== Select bibliography ==
- Berscheid, E. & Hatfield, E. (1969). Interpersonal attraction. New York: Addison-Wesley. ISBN 0-201-00560-3.
- Hatfield, E., Walster, G. W., & Berscheid, E. (1978). Equity: Theory and research. Boston: Allyn and Bacon. ISBN 0-205-05929-5.
- Hatfield, E. & Walster, G. W. (1985). A new look at love. Lanham, MD: University Press of America. [Winner: American Psychological Foundation's "National Media Award".] ISBN 978-0-8191-4957-2.
- Berscheid, E. & Hatfield, E. (1978). Interpersonal attraction, (2nd ed.) Reading, MS: Addison-Wesley. ISBN 0-201-00569-7
- Griffitt, W., & Hatfield, E. (1984). Human sexual behavior. Glenview, IL: Scott, Foresman & Co. ISBN 0-673-15057-7
- Hatfield, E., & Sprecher, S. (1986). Mirror, mirror: The importance of looks in everyday life. New York: SUNY Press. [Winner: American Psychological Association's "National Media Award", 1986.] ISBN 0-88706-124-9
- Carlson, J. G. & Hatfield, E. (1992). Psychology of emotion. New York: Harcourt, Brace, Jovanovich. ISBN 0-03-055419-5
- Hatfield, E., & Rapson, R. L. (1993). Love, sex, and intimacy: Their psychology, biology, and history. New York: HarperCollins. ISBN 0-06-500702-6
- Hatfield, E., Cacioppo, J., & Rapson, R. L. (1994). Emotional contagion. New York: Cambridge University Press. ISBN 0-521-44948-0
- Hatfield, E., & Rapson, R. (1996/2005). Love and sex: Cross-cultural perspectives. Needham Heights, MA: Allyn & Bacon. ISBN 0-205-16103-0 Reprint: Lanham, MD: University Press of America. ISBN 0-7618-3232-7.
- Hatfield, E., & Rapson, R., and Jeanette Purvis (2020). What's Next in Love and Sex: Psychological and Cultural Perspectives. New York: Oxford University Press. ISBN 978-0-1906-4716-2.
