= Sandra Langeslag =

Dutch cognitive psychologist on romantic love

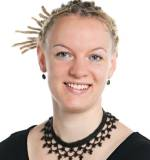
- Education: Ph.D.
- Alma mater: Erasmus University Rotterdam
- Scientific career
- Fields: Neurocognition; Romantic love
- Institutions: University of Missouri–St. Louis

Sandra Langeslag is a Dutch cognitive and biological psychologist who studies romantic love. Langeslag is the director of the Neurocognition of Emotion and Motivation Lab at the University of Missouri–St. Louis. She received her PhD from Erasmus University Rotterdam in The Netherlands. She's stated that out of the types of love commonly studied, she's most intrigued by the infatuation stage (also called passionate love).

Studies by Langeslag using EEG have demonstrated that self-regulating love feelings is possible, especially through a task called cognitive reappraisal. Cognitive reappraisal involves focusing on positive or negative aspects of the partner to change how one feels.

A 2012 experiment by Langeslag also contradicted a long-running hypothesis in love research which supposed that intrusive thoughts during early-stage romantic love might be caused by decreased serotonin levels. Her experiment found that serotonin levels were differently affected in men and women, and that obsessive thinking in women was actually associated with an increase in serotonin.

== Infatuation and attachment ==
A 2012 study by Langeslag and others determined that while the Passionate Love Scale is a commonly used instrument to measure passionate love, some of the questions actually measure companionate love as well. She developed a new questionnaire, the Infatuation and Attachment Scales (IAS), to measure slightly different constructs, which she refers to as infatuation and attachment:

Infatuation is the overwhelming, amorous feeling for one individual that is typically most intense during the early stage of love (i.e., when individuals are not (yet) in a relationship with their beloved or are in a new relationship). Attachment, on the other hand, is the comforting feeling of emotional bonding with another individual that takes some time to develop, often in the context of a romantic relationship.

== Love regulation ==
Langeslag studies love regulation, "the use of behavioral or cognitive strategies to change the intensity of current feelings of romantic love." Cognitive reappraisal is an emotion regulation strategy where one focuses on positive or negative aspects of e.g. the partner, the relationship or imagined future scenarios:

- In negative reappraisal, one focuses on negative qualities of the beloved ("he's lazy", "she's always late"), the relationship ("we fight a lot") or imagined future scenarios ("he'll cheat on me"). Negative reappraisal decreases feelings of infatuation and attachment, but decreases mood in the short term. Langeslag has recommended distraction as an antidote to the short-term decrease in mood.
- In positive reappraisal, one focuses on positive qualities of the beloved ("he's kind", "she's spontaneous"), the relationship ("we have so much fun together") or imagined future scenarios ("we'll live happily ever after"). Positive reappraisal increases attachment and can increase relationship satisfaction.
