= Social salience =

In social psychology, social salience is the extent to which a particular target draws the attention of an observer by standing out in a social context. The target may be a physical object or a person, and the observer could be an individual or group. If the target is a person, they may be alone or a member of a group (of which the observer may also be a part) or else in a situation of interpersonal communication. It can be based on the way a particular feature can be linked to a certain type of speaker, who is then associated with social and emotional evaluations. These evaluations are then transferred to the linguistic feature.

An observer's attention may be drawn to a target as a result of its certain general features. These features and aspects of a target can make them more or less socially salient, including:

- General object attributes – vivid colours, object's proximity to observer
- Difference between the target's attribute and its immediate environment.
- Difference between observer's expectations of a target and the target's observable attributes.
- Observer's goal – a target that matches goal-oriented searching.
- Whether the target is relevant to oneself.
- Whether the target is dangerous to oneself.
- Whether the target is attractive, which could be determined by the above features.

Social salience allows for observers to quickly detect changes in their environment. Given the limited cognitive capacity of humans, this is advantageous but can lead to biases and misperceptions as in the case of the representativeness heuristic. Awareness of this heuristic does not always completely mitigate its effect.

Social salience is also distinguished from cognitive salience in the sense that it consists of the variation along with attitudes, cultural stereotypes, and social values associated with it. In addition, the variation has already been used to carry social indexation. On the other hand, cognitive salience pertains to the objective property of linguistic variation that allows language users to pick up on it.

== Social salience of objects ==
While there are colours and patterns that are objectively more vivid, salience is a function of the difference between the target object and its environment, or "ground". The greater the difference between the target and the ground, the stronger the social salience of that target. In the case of social salience, this distinction is characterized as a comparison between the attributes of the target and the attributes of other items in the target's proximal ground. Other items in the target's proximal ground set the norm for attributes an observer can expect. When an object’s attributes violate those pre-set expectations, it is socially salient.

The strength of an object's social salience may also be underscored when it is the target of a goal-oriented search by an observer. An observer looking for a target object is more attuned to the object’s attributes and will be able to pick them out more rapidly from a crowd.

== Social salience of people ==
The social salience of an individual is a compilation of that individual's salient attributes. These may be changes to dress or physical attributes with respect to a previous point in time or with respect to the surrounding environment. Salient attributes of an individual may include the following:

- Clothing (e.g., boldly patterned clothing)
- Manipulation to physical appearance (e.g., novel hair colour)
- Accessory that is infrequent in presence across the general population or indicative of an individual change (e.g., a leg brace)

The social salience of an individual in a group is defined both by individual salient attributes and comparison with the attributes of other members of the group. As with the salience of objects, the social salience of an individual in a group depends on the attributes of the other members of that group. Little is known about social salience between groups but within-group preferences lead to greater social salience for members of an observer’s own group than for members outside of the group or in a different group. Salient attributes of an individual in a group may include the following:

- Activeness
- Trustworthiness
- Friendliness
- Volume of speech
- Reliability

Research has been conducted to specifically understand how the social salience of people works. One study examined social salience through exploring what categories come to perceiver’s minds when making initial impressions about people. Among participants’ responses, some of the most prevalent categorisations of people included:

- Personal characteristics
- Personal and social roles
- Appearance characteristics
- Context of situation
- Extended inferences

This indicates that the categorising way in which initial impressions are made can be related to the social salience of the person.

== Moderators of social salience ==
=== Positive Moderators of Social Salience ===
Positive moderators of social salience increase the likelihood of noticing or reacting to socially relevant stimuli.

==== Oxytocin ====
Oxytocin is a hormone, traditionally known for its role in female reproduction. Studies have increasingly shown that oxytocin also has a role in influencing social behaviour, linked to the fact it is released in the body and brain, and has interactive effects with other hormones.

It has been hypothesised to have a general effect on increasing the salience of individuals, and has a positive impact on the awareness of social cues in individuals with social impairment. The release of oxytocin both mediates directly prosocial behaviour and increases perception of social salience. It can lead to a wide range of emotions and behaviours related to social behaviour, and plays a role in modulating these. Examples include:

- Empathy
- Trust
- In-group references
- Memory of socially relevant cues

Oxytocin as a positive moderator is not limited to promoting only prosocial behaviour, as it enhances the processing of any socially relevant information. There has been some research suggesting that oxytocin can lead to the moderation of negative social responses, with the social salience hypothesis accounting for how oxytocin can have socially undesirable effects.

For example, social cues that are interpreted as “unsafe” may lead to oxytocin promoting more defensive emotions and behaviours. Certain contexts may result in the effects of oxytocin leading to increased feelings of mistrust. The nonprosocial effects of oxytocin can further be found in negative contexts that involve threats or competition, where there may be an enhancement of competitive or aggressive behaviours, such as attacking potential intruders and competing with rivals. Further research indicates that oxytocin may also be linked to increasing the salience of threat signals, which may lead to an individual having attention orienting responses to threatening social cues.

The way that oxytocin as a positive moderator can lead to prosocial and nonprosocial behaviour can be linked to the fact that the effects of oxytocin are often constrained by the features of the individual or the situation one is in. This is because whilst oxytocin may increase the sensitivity individuals have to social cues, it is dependent on contextual and individual factors. For example, its effects may be dependent on baseline individual differences, such as gender, personality traits, and degree of psychopathology. Additionally, its effects interact with contextual social cues, such as whether individuals are in a competitive or cooperative environment.

==== Self-relevance ====
Social salience has frequently been linked to self-bias and self-prioritisation, with the suggestion that people are biased towards information relevant to themselves in comparison to information relevant to other people. Data highlights that social association, particularly to self-related items, gives social salience to stimuli.

One explanation for this is that social saliency is promoted by a specific neural network in the brain. This network involves the connectivity between self-associated responses and attentional responses in the environment.

Another possible explanation is that self-association effects may be similar to the effects of reward. This can also be seen on a neural level, with self-related and reward-related processes evoking similar neutral circuits in the brain. In fact, some research suggests that there may be some overlap in representations of the self and of reward in the brain itself. Research suggests that self-related stimuli carries a higher intrinsic reward than stimuli associated with other people, which may explain why people are so biased to stimuli related to themselves.

The importance of social associations with self-relevant stimuli may be linked to human survival. In many contexts, it would be critical to have attention allocated to self-related stimuli, with an example being the awareness of potential dangers to one’s children.

==== Attention ====
Another factor that plays a role in moderating social salience is attention. Research shows that the prioritisation of social information is dependent on an individual deploying enough attention. This means that social salience effects rely on attention, and that even self-relevant cues won’t automatically capture processing unless there is enough attention available. Hence, whilst social salience is able to boost how strongly a stimulus is processed, it is positively moderated by attention.

Such attention can be considered particularly important when understanding how individuals process emotional expressions. Studies have explored the idea that emotional stimuli activate brain regions automatically, by exposing individuals to faces with emotional expressions, and comparing their reactions to faces with neutral expressions. Human faces are considered to contain salient social signals, so can mediate information about the identity, emotional state, and the intentions of oneself or others. It has been found that all brain regions respond to emotional faces, but only if there are enough attentional resources available.

==== Mortality ====
The salience of mortality is also an active moderator of social salience. Mechanistically, increasing salience of mortality increases fear of isolation and thereby improves the rate of altruistic pro-social behaviour. This spurs awareness of relevant social cues leading to increased social salience.

=== Negative Moderators of Social Salience ===
Negative moderators of social salience reduce the likelihood of noticing or reacting to socially relevant stimuli.

==== Technology ====
Machines with multiple channels of communication allow for interpersonal communication among many active parties. Fewer channels lead to a decreased social salience of other members as perceived by any one participant. Compared with direct communication, communication over digital interfaces result in fewer nonverbal cues that provide necessary information as to the relationships between participants (status-specific or otherwise) as well as other social context. As a result, communication over digital interfaces is less personable and less productive than in-person communication.
