= Romantic love (mental state) =

Mental state of being in love

In fields of the sciences, (Note: The term "romantic love" has a complicated history, and several common definitions. In biopsychology, there is a convention among the most prominent authors that the term refers to the mental state of being in love. Other areas of psychology may use the term with other connotations, referring to culture or beliefs, for example.) romantic love refers to the mental state of being passionately attracted to a specific individual, with focused attention (salience), for the purpose of courtship or pair bonding. The state of romantic love is considered to be a motivation or drive, which is distinct from (but related to) the concept of attachment.

Laypeople may refer to the state as being in love. A variety of other terms are also commonly associated with it. In psychology, it is often referred to as "passionate love". Other terms used to refer to it are "infatuation", "limerence", "obsessive love", and "eros". No single term has been universally adopted by academic literature on the subject.

Research on the biology of romantic love indicates that romantic love resembles addiction during the intense early stage (or when unreciprocated), but academics do not currently agree on how love addictions are defined.

Love which is not reciprocated is called "unrequited love", resulting in lovesickness.

== Definition ==
The evolutionary anthropologists Bode and Kushnick undertook a comprehensive review of romantic love from a biological perspective in 2021. They considered the psychology of romantic love, its mechanisms, development across the lifespan, functions, and evolutionary history. Based on the content of that review, they proposed a biological definition:

Romantic love is a motivational state typically associated with a desire for long-term mating with a particular individual. It occurs across the lifespan and is associated with distinctive cognitive, emotional, behavioral, social, genetic, neural, and endocrine activity in both sexes. Throughout much of the life course, it serves mate choice, courtship, sex, and pair-bonding functions. It is a suite of adaptations and by-products that arose sometime during the recent evolutionary history of humans.

Researchers draw distinctions between the early stage of romantic love and the "attachment system" theorized by the attachment theorists like John Bowlby. In the past, attachment theorists have argued that attachment theory and attachment styles can replace other theories of love, but academics on love have argued that romantic love and attachment are not identical concepts. The early stage of romantic love is thought to involve additional brain systems for other purposes, with distinct evolutionary histories.

Romantic attraction is also distinct from sexual attraction, although they most often occur together.

Romantic love is not necessarily "dyadic", "social", or "interpersonal", despite being related to pair bonding. Romantic love can be experienced outside the context of a relationship, for example, in the case of unrequited love where the feelings are not reciprocated. A person can develop romantic love feelings before any relationship has occurred, for only a potential partner. The potential partner can even be somebody they do not know well or are not acquainted with at all, as in cases of love at first sight and parasocial attachments.

Variation exists in the way romantic love is expressed in the population. A cross-cultural study of currently in-love people found four clusters, with varying degrees of intensity, obsessive thinking, commitment, frequency of sex, and other differences. Other studies indicate romantic love can be experienced both with or without obsessional features. Typically, intense romantic love is limited to a duration of 12–18 months or as long as 3 years, depending on the estimate; however, in the phenomenon of long-term intense romantic love, some people experience intense attraction inside a relationship, even for 10 years or more. This is similar to early-stage intense romantic love, but with less obsessional features.

== Attachment theory ==
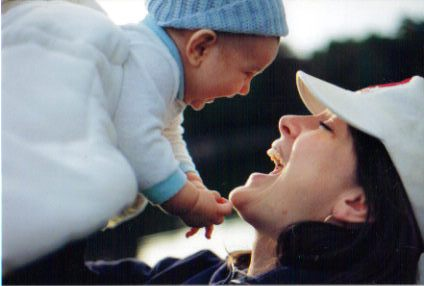
Mother with child

As attachment theory became a prominent framework for explaining adult pair bonds, a contention arose among researchers over how romantic love relates to the "attachment system" from attachment theory. The attachment system was originally conceived of by John Bowlby as a system evolved to keep infants in proximity of their caregiver (or "attachment figure"). The child uses the attachment figure as a "secure base" to feel safe exploring the environment, seeks proximity with the attachment figure when threatened, and suffers distress when separated. A prominent theory suggests this system is reused for adult pair bonds, as an evolutionary exaptation or co-option, whereby a given trait takes on a new purpose. Adults in romantic or intimate relationships exhibit attachment behaviors with their partners (e.g. proximity seeking, safe haven, separation distress, etc.) which are similar to children with their parents.

In a version of this theory from romantic love researchers, the attachment system became synonymous with companionate love (and therefore distinct from being in love), as in Helen Fisher's popular theory of independent emotion systems.

Initially, it was believed that an attachment bond takes about two years to form, and that such attachment functions play little to no role in new relationships until this occurs. However, later research indicated that the attachment system is in fact active during the early stage of romantic love. A series of studies by Paul Eastwick and Eli Finkel demonstrated that attachment anxiety motivated proximity seeking, with behaviors directed towards relationship formation, even in study participants who were not in a relationship. Furthermore, this "partner-specific" attachment anxiety was distinguishable from the anxious attachment style, and it was associated with an increase in passionate love scores. The attachment system is also believed to be associated with oxytocin, which has been found circulating in people experiencing the early stage of romantic love.

A newer theory then states that romantic love also involves the attachment system, but with additional brain systems for its other features (intense attraction, obsessive thinking, and so on).

== Components ==
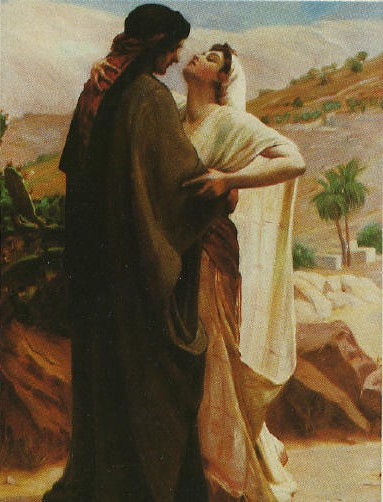
Passionate Encounter, by Frederick Goodall

The most common measure of romantic love is the Passionate Love Scale, created by Elaine Hatfield and Susan Sprecher. The components of passionate love according to Hatfield & Sprecher are:

1. Cognitive
  1. Intrusive thinking; preoccupation with the thoughts of the partner.
  2. Idealization of the loved one and the relationship.
  3. Desire for knowledge: to know and be known by the partner.
2. Emotional
  1. Attraction to the other; pleasant feelings for the other when things go well.
  2. Ambivalence or negative feelings (emptiness, anxiety, despair) when things go awry.
  3. Longing for reciprocity.
  4. Desire for "complete union," permanency.
  5. Physiological (sexual) arousal.
3. Behavioral
  1. Actions aimed at determining the other's feelings.
  2. Serving and helping the other.

=== Obsessive thinking ===
Obsessive thinking about a loved one has been called a hallmark or a cardinal trait of romantic love, ensuring that the loved one is not forgotten. Some reports have been made that people can even spend as much as 85 to 100% of their days and nights thinking about a love object. One study found that on average people in love spent 65% of their waking hours thinking about their beloved. Another study used cluster analysis to find several different groups of lovers, with the least intense group spending 35% of their time on average and the most intense at 72%.

Since the late 1990s, these obsessional features have been compared to obsessive–compulsive disorder (OCD). Another theory relates obsessive thinking to addiction, because drug users exhibit obsessive thoughts about drug use as well as compulsions.

=== Positive illusions ===
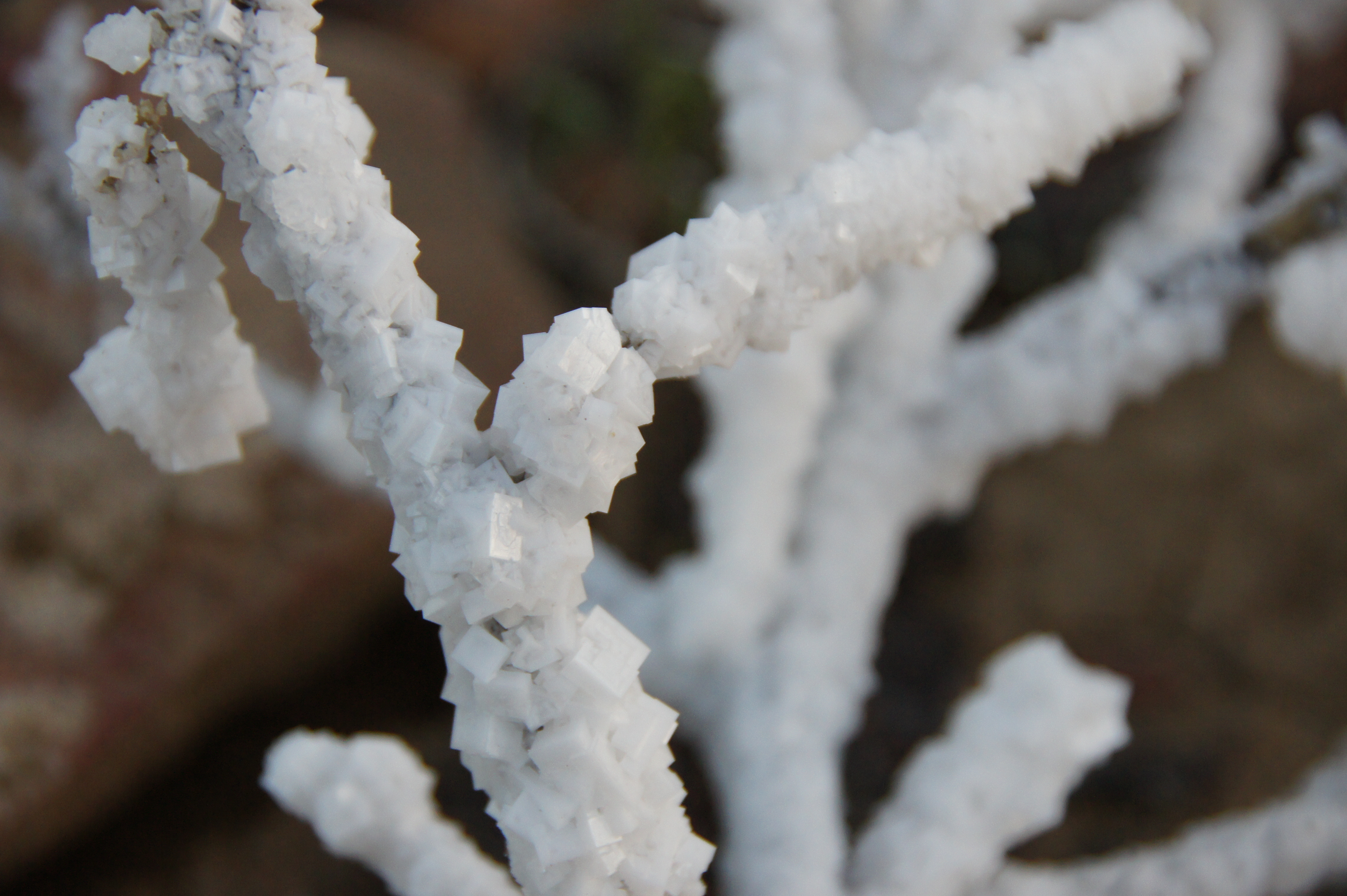
"Crystallization" was coined by the 19th-century French writer Stendhal to refer to these positive illusions, based on an analogy where a tree branch is tossed into a salt mine. The tree branch (or twig) becomes covered in salt crystals, transforming it "into an object of shimmering beauty".

People in love tend to overemphasize the positive aspects of their loved one or relationship, while overlooking or devaluing negative aspects. This is regarded as a type of cognitive bias called positive illusions. The phenomenon has also been referred to as crystallization, idealization, "love is blind" bias, putting the loved one on a pedestal, or seeing through rose-colored glasses.

In the past, some authors have depicted the phenomenon as a malady, arguing that people who idealize would have their partner fall short of their high expectations as a relationship progresses; however, despite this, significant modern scientific evidence has shown that positive illusions actually contribute to relationship satisfaction, long-term well-being and decreased risk for relationship discontinuation.

A study by Marta Kowal and Adam Bode published in 2026 tested the assumption that "love is blind" to a partner's imperfections, in other words, "whether love intensity changes when imperfections become explicit". Half of the participants reflected on their partner's flaws, while the other half (a control group) did not. Love intensity of the participants was then measured using a version of the Triangular Love Scale. Analysis revealed no significant difference in love scores between the two groups of participants—except for those whose partners engaged in aggression or infidelity, who reported lower levels of love. (However this difference could also reflect other preexisting relationship issues.)

Bode & Kowal conclude based on their study that love is not "blind" per se, because lovers can in fact identify the flaws in their beloved; however, "lovers do not necessarily act on these perceptions. Instead, they experience love and maintain their commitment to their partners. Love, in this context, could function as a binding glue that helps sustain the relationship."

=== Emotional valence ===
Rather than being a specific emotion itself, romantic love is believed to be a motivation or drive which elicits different emotions depending on the situation: positive feelings when things go well, and negative feelings when awry. Reciprocated love may elicit feelings of joy, ecstasy, or fulfillment, for example, but unrequited love or separation may elicit feelings of sadness, anxiety, or despair.

A 2014 study of Iranian young adults found that the early stage of romantic love was associated with the brighter side of hypomania (elation, mental and physical activity, and positive social interaction) and better sleep quality, but also stronger symptoms of depression and anxiety. Those authors conclude that romantic love is "not entirely a joyful and happy period of life". A different study of adolescents (aged 16 to 21) also found that infatuation in relationships was associated with sleep disturbance too, rather than better sleep quality.

The feeling of romantic love may be either pleasant or unpleasant, regardless of the intensity level. One of Dorothy Tennov's interview participants recalls being in love this way: "When I felt [Barry] loved me, I was intensely in love and deliriously happy; when he seemed rejecting, I was still intensely in love, only miserable beyond words." The intensity of love feelings is also distinct from whether an individual is satisfied with their relationship (although the measures have been shown to be related to some extent). One can be satisfied with their relationship because it fulfills some other need besides love for their partner (like money or child care), or conversely be in love with an abuser in an abusive relationship.

Unrequited love is common among young adults. A study by Roy Baumeister and Sarah Stillwell found that 92.8% of participants reported at least one "powerful or moderate" experience of unrequited love in the past 5 years. A different study found 63% had a "huge crush" at least once in the past 2 years (but not letting the person know), and unrequited love was four times more frequent than equal love. Another found that 20% had experienced unrequited love more than 5 times, according to a definition of "having one’s emotions on a roller coaster, finding it difficult to concentrate, and thinking constantly about the person with whom you are in love. The person is said to have the power to produce extreme highs and lows of emotion in you, depending on how he or she acts towards you."

== Obsessive and harmonious passion ==
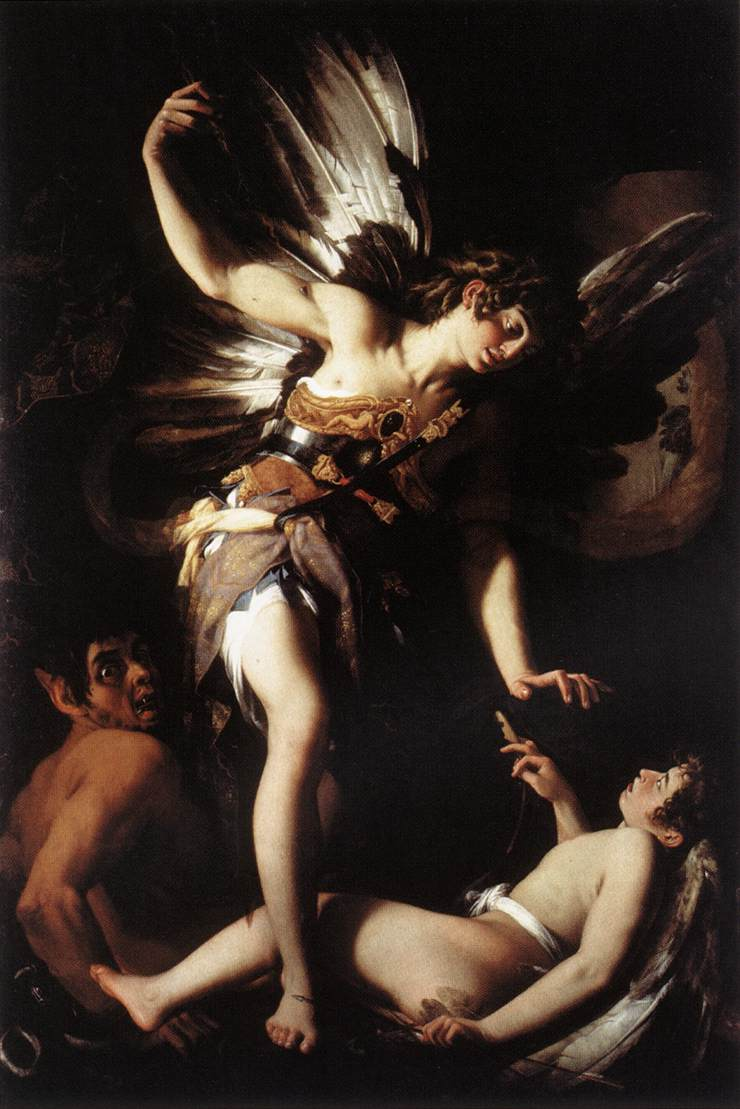
Divine Love Conquering Earthly Love, by Giovanni Baglione.

The dualistic model of passion (DMP) is a theory invented by the psychologist Robert Vallerand which suggests that passion can be split into two components, termed "obsessive" and "harmonious" passion:

- In obsessive passion, a person's passion is driven by internal pressure, controlling them and interfering with other aspects of their life.
- In harmonious passion, the person experiencing it retains their autonomy, and their passion is more in harmony with other life domains.

DMP has been extended to romantic passion, with a study finding that harmonious romantic passion was associated with secure attachment, while obsessive romantic passion was associated with anxious attachment. One issue addressed by the model is the idea that passion is either positive or negative based on whether it's reciprocated or not (as in Elaine Hatfield's conception of passionate love), because this ignores the possibility of negative outcomes occurring inside a relationship. Negative relationship outcomes are proposed to be mainly associated with obsessive passion.

The obsessive–harmonious distinction has also been compared to the distinction between two of the love styles invented by John Alan Lee: mania (obsessive) and eros (harmonious). Both eros and mania correspond to concepts like romantic love, passionate love, and falling in love; however, mania is regarded as the more obsessive of the two.

"Limerence" is a term invented by the psychologist Dorothy Tennov to refer to the state of being in love, particularly when it takes the form of obsessive passion. Limerence and mania have been compared as being similar concepts, identified and developed by their respective authors around the same time.

Research on the Passionate Love Scale (PLS) by Bianca Acevedo and Arthur Aron also found that while it was intended as a unidimensional measure of love feelings, it actually has two general components (called factors): an obsession factor and a non-obsession factor. The PLS obsession factor has items like "Sometimes I feel I can't control my thoughts; they are obsessively on my partner." and "An existence without my partner would be dark and dismal." The non-obsession factor has items like "For me, my partner is the perfect romantic partner." and "I want my partner—physically, emotionally, and mentally."

Acevedo & Aron also compare being in love with obsessional elements to concepts like mania and limerence, while love without obsession is compared to eros. Taken together, eros and mania correspond to the way passionate love is operationalized on the PLS.

According to a meta-analysis by Acevedo & Aron, romantic love with and without obsession (using the PLS) have slightly different trajectories in a relationship. Romantic love with obsession was more associated with satisfaction in short-term relationships than long-term, whereas the associations between satisfaction and romantic love without obsession were similar and large for both short-term and long-term groups. Additionally, it was found that romantic love may sustain over a longer period than previously assumed, but without the obsessional features. Another meta-analysis found that the mania love attitude was associated with decreased satisfaction, as it continues over time in a relationship.

== Long-term intense romantic love ==
Usually intense romantic love lasts for just about a year or 18 months in a relationship. After this, the feeling is usually said to fade away and transition into companionate love (i.e. strong liking, affection, or friendship), although companionate love may also be present at the beginning of a relationship too, and even precede romantic love.

In research led by Bianca Acevedo, however, it was discovered that feelings of intense romantic love can last much longer than previously thought. A 2011 fMRI experiment looked at the brains of men and women who had been married on average 21 years but professed to still be "madly in love", and confirmed that there was brain activity much like newly-in-love people—in dopamine-rich reward areas (interpreted as "wanting" or "desire for union"), but also in an area rich with opioid receptors (associated with the hedonic or "liking" aspect of reward). However, unlike people who were newly in love, the long-married participants did not show activity in areas associated with anxiety and fear, and reported far less obsessional features.

Helen Fisher, a co-author on Acevedo's study, recommends in her books that to make feelings of romance last in a relationship, couples should make a point to do novel and exciting things together which stimulate pleasure centers in the brain, and maintain their positive illusions about each other (i.e. over-evaluating positive features, and suspending their negative judgment). Fisher has also spoken of her "living apart together" arrangement with her own husband (living separately two days a week), saying it's a "great way to have a really long-term romance". In a 2024 podcast, she recalled being "madly in love" with him for nine years.

Romantic desire normally fades because of a habituation effect: as a reward is more easily and predictably obtained, the dopamine release in response to reward cues decreases. Because the value of any reward is relative to a person's current comparison level (what they are expecting), as lovers habituate to each other's physical presence and specific behaviors, those behaviors would need to be replaced by new rewarding interactions for a continually romantic experience. "Variety, variety, variety", says Fisher.

== Self-expansion ==
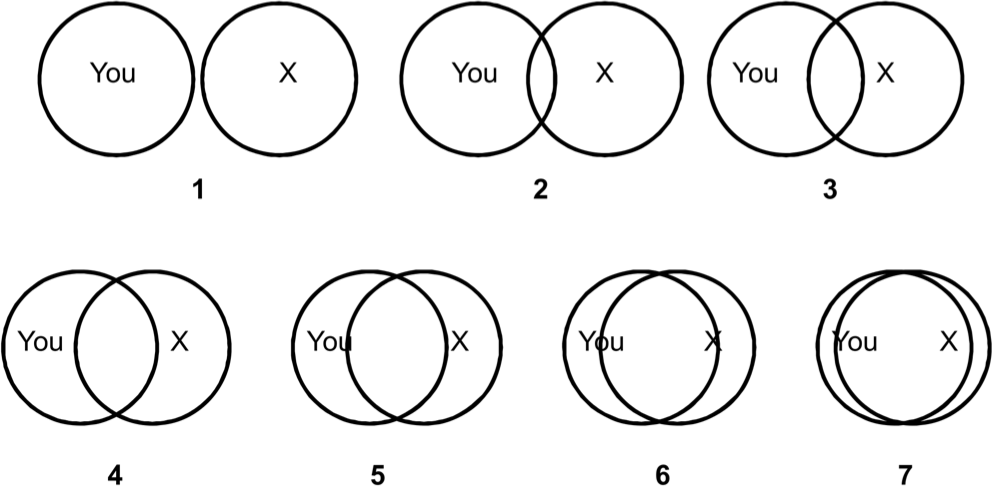
Inclusion of the other in the self (IOS) is typically measured with the IOS Scale.

The self-expansion model of interpersonal relationships is a variant of the reward theory of attraction which proposes that people have a basic motivation to expand their physical influence, cognitive complexity, social or bodily identity, and self-awareness, and that the psychological reward from falling in love is whatever creates this "expansion of the self". Relationships are an important area for self-expansion, via a process called "inclusion of the other in the self" (IOS), where aspects of a partner (e.g. traits, skills, attitudes, resources, abilities, and worldviews) are incorporated into one's own self concept. Self-expansion can also take the form of having new and exciting experiences with a partner.

According to the theory, attraction arises when opportunities for self-expansion are perceived. This is used to explain the "strong attraction" of romantic love, including intense varieties of passionate love or limerence, when the rate of expansion is rapid and approaches the maximum total possible from all sources. The theory also predicts that romantic feelings fade inside a relationship, in part when opportunities for rapid self-expansion become exhausted, and that one way couples can avoid the typical decline in love and satisfaction is by engaging in expanding activities together.

In Bianca Acevedo's fMRI study on long-term intense romantic love, IOS scores were shown to correlate with brain activity in the ventral tegmental area, situated in the brain's reward and motivation system, and associated with romantic desire. Brain imaging studies of romantic love repeatedly find these kinds of dopamine reward system areas active; accordingly, romantic love would be considered more motivational than emotional, which is consistent with the notion of self-expansion as a powerful motivation.

Following Acevedo's research, a 2014 study used items from the Love Attitudes Scale (LAS) to test whether self-expansion was associated with different types of love in relationships of different durations (ranging from as short as 1 day to as long as 65 years). LAS items were selected and modified to fit the survey format (which was a telephone interview): eros was used as a measure of romantic love, mania for obsession, and storge for companionate love. (Note: Sheets used the following modified LAS items: Eros: "Your partner fits your ideal standards of beauty/handsomeness" and "Your partner and you have the right physical chemistry".; Mania: "If your partner ignores you, you do things to get his/her attention" and "Since being with your partner, you find it hard to focus on the routines of life".; Storge: "Your love for your partner is really just a deep friendship".) This study found that self-expansion was positively associated with romantic love (eros), regardless of the duration of the relationship (old or new). Self-expansion was also positively associated with obsession (mania), but the association was stronger in newer relationships and seemed to decrease over time. Finally, there was no association between self-expansion and companionate love (storge), using the measure that "your love for your partner is really just a deep friendship".

In modern research, the LAS eros subscale has been sometimes used to measure the intensity of romantic love—including as a measure used by Acevedo's fMRI study.

== Neuroscience ==
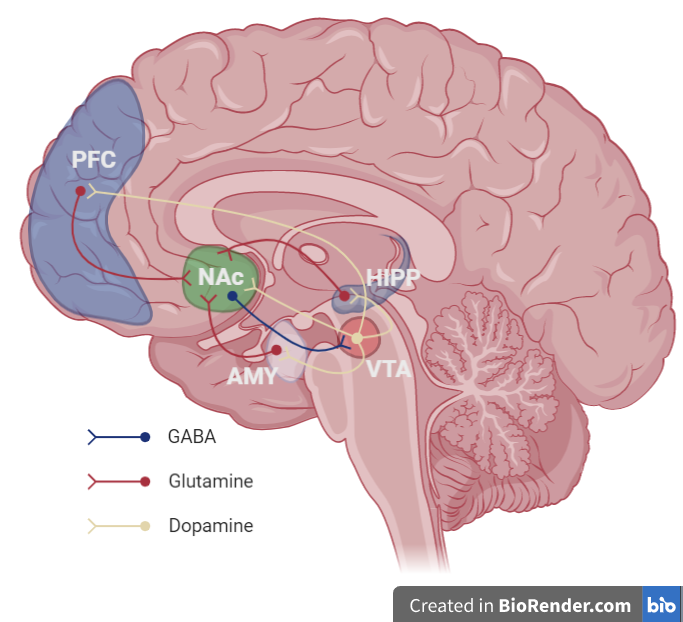
Dopamine is produced in the ventral tegmental area (VTA) of the brain, and projected to the nucleus accumbens (NAc). Dopamine activity in the NAc is key to the attribution of salience.

=== Dopamine ===
The early stage of romantic love is being compared to a behavioral addiction (i.e., addiction to a non-substance) but the "substance" involved is the loved person. Addiction involves a phenomenon known as incentive salience, also called "wanting" (in quotes). This is the property by which cues in the environment stand out to a person and become attention-grabbing and attractive, like a "motivational magnet" which pulls a person towards a particular reward. Incentive salience differs from craving in that craving is a conscious experience while incentive salience may or may not be. While incentive salience can give feelings of strong urgency to cravings, it can also motivate behavior unconsciously, as in an experiment where cocaine users were unaware of their own decisions to choose a low dose of cocaine (which they believed was placebo) more often than an actual placebo. In the incentive-sensitization theory of addiction, repeated drug use renders the brain hypersensitive to drugs and drug cues, resulting in pathological levels of "wanting" to use drugs. People in love are thought to experience incentive salience in response to their beloved. Lovers share other similarities with addicts as well, like tolerance, dependence, withdrawal, relapse, craving, and mood modification.

Incentive salience is mediated by dopamine projections in the mesocorticolimbic pathway of the brain, an area generally involved with reward, motivation, and reinforcement learning. Dopamine signaling for incentive salience originates in the ventral tegmental area (VTA) and projects to areas such as the nucleus accumbens (NAc) in the ventral striatum. The VTA is one of two main areas of the brain with neurons which produce dopamine (the other being the substantia nigra pars compacta). Projections from the VTA innervate the NAc, where dopamine activity attaches motivational significance to stimuli associated with rewards. Brain scans of people in love using fMRI (commonly while looking at a photograph of their beloved) show activations in these areas like the VTA and NAc. Another dopamine-rich area of the reward system shown to be active in romantic love is the caudate nucleus, containing 80% of the brain's dopamine receptor sites, located in the dorsal striatum. The dorsal striatum is implicated in reinforcement learning, and the caudate nucleus has shown activity in response to a monetary reward and cocaine. This activity in reward and motivation areas suggests that early-stage intense romantic love is a motivation system or goal-oriented state (rather than a specific emotion), consistent with the description of romantic love as a desire or longing for union with another person. These activations are also consistent with the similarity between romantic love and addiction.

=== Oxytocin ===
Oxytocin is sometimes called the "love hormone", because of its involvement in the mechanisms of maternal behavior and adult pair bonding. Oxytocin is synthesized primarily in an area of the hypothalamus and released into the blood via the pituitary gland, where it has been found circulating in people in the early stages of romantic love. Additionally, the hypothalamus projects oxytocin to other areas of the brain, like the ventral tegmental area (VTA), nucleus accumbens (NAc), amygdala, and hippocampus. The projections to reward areas (VTA and NAc) are thought to modulate social salience, or i.e. the level of dopamine activity in response to socially-relevant stimuli. This oxytocin signaling in reward pathways may also be the source of salience in response to a loved one.

=== Opioids ===
Modern research is increasingly showing the importance of endogenous opioids in love and social attachment, particularly the β-endorphin (the most potent endogenous opioid) and the μ-opioid receptor system. While opioids have their origin being the body's natural painkiller, they're also implicated in a variety of other systems, essentially like neurotransmitters. Opioid receptors are located throughout the brain, including in the limbic system (affecting basic emotions) and neocortex (affecting more conscious decision-making). Opioids are linked to the consummatory part of reward, or i.e. "liking" or pleasure, and released in areas of the brain called hedonic hotspots (or pleasure centers). Hedonic hotspots are located in the nucleus accumbens, the ventral pallidum and other areas. This function includes social reward, or the pleasurable aspect of social interactions.

== See also ==
- Biology of romantic love – Evolution and neuroscience of romantic love
- Infatuation – Intense, irrational attraction
- Limerence – Love madness or intense infatuation
- Lovesickness – Mental state of unfulfilled or unrequited love
- New relationship energy – State of mind during new relationship
- Obsessive love – Possessiveness and inability to accept rejection
- Passionate and companionate love – Two basic love feelings
- Romance – Love focused on feelings
- Theories of love – Psychological and sociological theories
