= Clyde Hendrick =

American psychologist (1936–2022)

Clyde A. Hendrick
- Born: July 13, 1936; Reed, Oklahoma, U.S.
- Died: August 6, 2022 (aged 86)
- Education: Humboldt State University (BA); University of Missouri (PhD, 1967)
- Known for: Love Attitudes Scale
- Spouse: Susan Hendrick
- Scientific career
- Fields: Social psychology; Romantic love; Interpersonal relationships
- Workplaces: Texas Tech University

Clyde A. Hendrick (July 13, 1936 – August 6, 2022) was an American social psychologist, and a Horn Professor of Psychology at Texas Tech University. Along with his wife, Susan Hendrick, he is known for developing the Love Attitudes Scale, an instrument commonly used in romantic love research.

== Career ==
In 1967, Hendrick received his PhD in psychology from the University of Missouri.

In the early part of his career, Hendrick worked at a number of universities, including Humboldt State University, Kent State University, and University of Miami. He assumed the role of Dean of the Graduate School at Texas Tech University in 1984.

His research interests included love, close relationships, attitudes, beliefs, communication, language, sexuality, gender, personality, and individual differences. A secondary interest of his was the writings of Charles S. Peirce, and areas of philosophy such as the philosophy of science.

In 1986, together with his wife, Susan Hendrick, he developed the Love Attitudes Scale (LAS). Research using the LAS is an extension of the color wheel theory of love invented by John Alan Lee. The LAS has since been translated into a dozen languages. The Hendricks were once called "the love doctors" in a Texas Tech Valentine's Day advice column.

He has served as the first editor of Personality and Social Psychology Bulletin, and acting editor for the Journal of Personality and Social Psychology.

In 1996, Hendrick was named a Horn Professor by Texas Tech, the highest honor bestowed by the university upon a faculty member.

He retired from Texas Tech in 2014.

== Publications ==
- Hendrick, Clyde (1987). Group Processes. UMI Books on Demand. ISBN 978-0-608-01144-8.
- Shaver, Phillip; Hendrick, Clyde (March 1, 1987). Sex and Gender. SAGE Publications. ISBN 978-0-8039-2929-6.
- Hendrick, Clyde; Clark, Margaret S. (1990). Research Methods in Personality and Social Psychology. Books on Demand. ISBN 978-0-608-01616-0.
- Hendrick, Susan; Hendrick, Clyde (1992). Liking, Loving and Relating. Brooks/Cole. ISBN 978-0-534-16014-2.
- Hendrick, Susan S.; Hendrick, Clyde (June 10, 1992). Romantic Love. SAGE Publications. ISBN 978-0-8039-3671-3.
- Hendrick, Clyde; Hendrick, Susan (2000). Close Relationships: A Sourcebook. SAGE. ISBN 978-0-7619-1606-2.
- Hendrick, Clyde; Jones, Russell A. (October 22, 2013). The Nature of Theory and Research in Social Psychology. Academic Press. ISBN 978-1-4832-6089-1.
- Hendrick, Clyde (June 19, 2015). Perspectives on Social Psychology. Psychology Press. ISBN 978-1-317-56236-8.
