= NRE =

NRE, an acronym or initialism, may refer to:

- National Railway Equipment Company
- National Rail Enquiries
- National Register of Electors, in Canada
- Negative regulatory element
- New relationship energy
- Non-renewable energy
- Non-recurring engineering
- In fluid mechanics and heat transfer, N_{Re} is a common notation for the Reynolds number
- Natural Resources and Environment
  - Department of Natural Resources and Environment Tasmania, Australia
  - Forests Commission Victoria, Australia
  - Malaysia, under the Ministry of Science, Technology and Innovation (Malaysia)
  - United states, Under Secretary of Agriculture for Natural Resources and Environment or USA(NRE)
- Null Reference Exception (Null_pointer#Null_dereferencing)
