= Susan Hendrick =

American psychologist

Susan S. Hendrick
- Education: Kent State University (PhD, 1978)
- Known for: Love Attitudes Scale
- Spouse: Clyde Hendrick
- Scientific career
- Fields: Counseling psychology; Social psychology; Interpersonal relationships; Romantic love
- Workplaces: Texas Tech University

Susan S. Hendrick is an American psychologist and Horn Professor of Psychology at Texas Tech University. Along with her husband, Clyde Hendrick, she is known for developing the Love Attitudes Scale, an instrument commonly used in romantic love research.

== Career ==
Hendrick received her PhD from Kent State University in 1978.

Later, in Miami, Florida, she was in private practice, and taught at University of Miami.

She began working at Texas Tech University in 1984, where she taught both graduate and undergraduate courses, including a course on close relationships—a field she and her husband Clyde Hendrick helped develop.

In 1986, together with Clyde, she developed the Love Attitudes Scale (LAS). Research using the LAS is an extension of the color wheel theory of love invented by John Alan Lee. The LAS has since been translated into a dozen languages. The Hendricks were once called "the love doctors" in a Texas Tech Valentine's Day advice column.

Hendrick was an associate editor of the Journal of Social and Clinical Psychology, and served on the editorial boards of Journal of Marriage and the Family and Contemporary Psychology.

In 2005, she was named a Horn Professor by Texas Tech, the highest honor bestowed by the university upon a faculty member.

== Publications ==
- Hendrick, Susan; Hendrick, Clyde (1992). Liking, Loving and Relating. Brooks/Cole. ISBN 978-0-534-16014-2.
- Hendrick, Susan S.; Hendrick, Clyde (1992-06-10). Romantic Love. SAGE Publications. ISBN 978-0-8039-3671-3.
- Hendrick, Susan (1995). Close Relationships: What Couple Therapists Can Learn. Brooks/ Cole Publishing Company. ISBN 978-0-534-25434-6.
- Hendrick, Clyde; Hendrick, Susan (2000). Close Relationships: A Sourcebook. SAGE. ISBN 978-0-7619-1606-2.
- Hendrick, Susan (2004). Understanding Close Relationships. Pearson. ISBN 978-0-205-34985-2.
