= Triangular theory of love =

Psychological theory by Robert Sternberg

The triangular theory of love is a theory of love developed by Robert Sternberg. In the context of interpersonal relationships, "the three components of love, according to the triangular theory, are an intimacy component, a passion component, and a commitment component."

Sternberg says that intimacy refers to "feelings of closeness, connectedness, and bondedness in loving relationships," passion refers to "the drives that lead to romance, physical attraction, sexual consummation, and related phenomena in loving relationships" and decision/commitment means different things in the short and long term. In the short-term, it refers to "the decision that one loves a certain other", and in the long-term, it refers to "one's commitment to maintain that love."

== Components ==
Different stages and types of love can be explained as different combinations of these three elements; for example, the relative emphasis of each component changes over time as an adult romantic relationship develops. A relationship based on a single element is less likely to survive than one based on two or three elements. "The amount of love one experiences depends on the absolute strength of these three components, and the type of love one experiences depends on their strengths relative to each other."

The three components of love as described in the theory are as follows:

=== Intimacy ===
Intimacy is the attachment and bonding component in the model. This type of relationship is associated with connection and understanding.

Intimacy is primarily defined as something of a personal or private nature; familiarity.

=== Passion ===
Passion is the drive and excitement component in the model. This type of relationship is associated with romance and sexual desire.

Passion is primarily defined as a strong feeling of enthusiasm or excitement for something or about doing something.

=== Commitment ===
Commitment is the decision and continuation component in the model. This type of relationship is associated with finality and the future.

Commitment is primarily defined as an agreement or pledge to do something.

== Influences ==
Among the early theories of love, two are particularly influential in the development of Sternberg's model.

The first is a theory presented by Zick Rubin named The Theory of Liking vs. Loving. In his theory, to define romantic love, Rubin concludes that attachment, caring, and intimacy are the three main principles that are key to the difference of liking one person and loving them. Rubin states that if a person simply enjoys another's presence and spending time with them, that person only likes the other. However, if a person shares a strong desire for intimacy and contact, as well as cares equally about the other's needs and their own, the person loves the other. In Sternberg's theory, one of his main principles is intimacy. It is clear that intimacy is an important aspect of love, ultimately using it to help define the difference between compassionate and passionate love.

The second, presented by John Lee, is the color wheel model of love. In his theory, using the analogy of primary colors to love, Lee defines the three different styles of love: Eros, Ludus, and Storge. Most importantly within his theory, he concludes that these three primary styles, like the making of complementary colors, can be combined to make secondary forms of love. In Sternberg's theory, he presents, like Lee, that through the combination of his three main principles, different forms of love are created.

Sternberg also described three models of love, including the Spearmanian, Thomsonian, and Thurstonian models. According to the Spearmanian model, love is a single bundle of positive feelings. In the Thomsonian model, love is a mixture of multiple feeling that, when brought together, produce the feeling. The Thurstonian model is the closest to the triangular theory of love, and posits that love is made up of a set of feelings of approximately equal importance that are best understood on their own rather than as an integrated whole. In this model, these various factors contribute simultaneously to the experience of love, and can be disconnected from each other.

== Elaboration ==
Sternberg's triangular theory of love was developed after the identification of passionate love and companionate love. Passionate love is focused on the present at the onset of a relationship, while companionate love endures and grows over time with deep meanings in that relationship. Both are different kinds of love but are connected in relationships.

Passionate love is associated with strong feelings of love and desire for a specific person. This love is full of excitement and novelty. There is a chemical component to passionate love; those experiencing it enjoy an increase in brain activity involving the neurochemicals dopamine and oxytocin. There is empirical research, particularly from linking love to the opioid circuit in the brain. These feelings are most commonly found in the most early stages of love.

Companionate love follows passionate love. Companionate love is also known as affectionate love. When a couple reaches this level of love, they feel mutual understanding and care for each other. This love is important for the survival of the relationship. This type of love comes later on in the relationship and requires a certain level of knowledge in each person in the relationship.

Sternberg created his triangle next. The triangle's points are intimacy, passion, and commitment.

Intimate love is the corner of the triangle that encompasses the close bonds of loving relationships. Intimate love felt between two people means that they each feel a sense of high regard for the other. They wish to make each other happy, share with each other, be in communication with each other, help when one is in need. Two people with intimate love deeply value each other. Intimate love has been called the "warm" love because of the way it brings two people close together. Sternberg predicted that intimacy levels would decline in longer relationships, but this was not borne out in a later study.

Passionate love is based on drive. Couples in passionate love feel physically attracted to each other. Sexual desire is typically a component of passionate love. Passionate love is not limited to sexual attraction, however. It is a way for couples to express feelings of nurture, dominance, submission, self-actualization, etc. Passionate love is considered the "hot" component of love because of the strong presence of arousal between two people. Sternberg believed that passionate love would diminish as the positive force of the relationship is taken over by opposite forces. This idea comes from Solomon's opponent-force theory. But the study mentioned earlier found this to be true only for females.

Commitment, or committed love, is that of lovers who are committed to being together for a long period of time. Something to note about commitment, however, is that one can be committed to someone without feeling the other two loves for him or her, and one can feel the other two loves for someone without being committed to him or her. Commitment is considered to be the "cold" love because it does not require either intimacy or passion. Sternberg believed that committed love increases in intensity as the relationship grows. Commitment can be present with friends as well.

Sternberg believed love to progress and evolve in predictable ways—that all couples in love will experience intimate, passionate, and committed love in the same patterns.

Although these types of love may contain qualities that exist in non-loving relationships, they are specific to loving relationships. A description of non-love is listed below, along with the other kinds of love. These kinds of love are combinations of one or two of the three corners of Sternberg's triangle of love.

== Forms of love ==
The three components, labeled on the vertices of a triangle, interact with each other so as to form seven different kinds of love experiences

Combinations of intimacy, passion, commitment
	Intimacy	Passion	Commitment
Non-love			
Liking/friendship	x		
Infatuated love		x	
Empty love			x
Romantic love	x	x	
Companionate love	x		x
Fatuous love		x	x
Consummate love	x	x	x

The three components, pictorially labeled on the vertices of a triangle, interact with each other and with the actions they produce so as to form seven different kinds of love experiences (non-love is not represented). The size of the triangle functions to represent the "amount" of love—the bigger the triangle, the greater the love. Each corner has its own type of love and provides different combinations to create different types of love and labels for them. The shape of the triangle functions to represent the "style" of love, which may vary over the course of the relationship:

- Non-love: The absence of any components of love. No connection. Indifferent to relationship.
- Liking/friendship (Intimacy): This type simply involves a positive connection to the other without romance, such as friendships and acquaintances.
- Infatuated love (Passion): Also known as "puppy love", this type consists of romantic interest without yet forming a connection to the other. Romantic relationships often start out as infatuated love and become romantic love as intimacy develops over time. Without developing intimacy or commitment, infatuated love may disappear suddenly.
- Empty love (Commitment): This type is when love has no romance or understanding, deteriorating into empty love. In an arranged marriage, the spouses' relationship may begin as empty love and develop into another form, indicating "how empty love need not be the terminal state of a long-term relationship ... [but] the beginning rather than the end".
- Romantic love (Intimacy & Passion): This type involves both the romance and connection of the other, which could be a romantic affair or a one-night stand.
- Companionate love (Intimacy & Commitment): This type is a long-term positive connection to the other without romance, "observed in long-term marriages where passion is no longer present." It is usually associated with close friends and family.
- Fatuous love (Passion & Commitment): This type is a long-term romantic relationship without connection. Marriages under this type lack the stability of intimacy and often become displeasing.
- Consummate love (Intimacy, Passion, & Commitment): The complete form of love in the model. Of the seven varieties of love, consummate love is theorized to be that associated with the "perfect couple". According to Sternberg, these couples will continue to have sex fifteen years or more into the relationship, they cannot imagine themselves happier over the long-term with anyone else, they overcome their few difficulties gracefully, and each delights in the relationship with the other. However, Sternberg cautions that maintaining a consummate love may be even harder than achieving it. He stresses the importance of translating the components of love into action. "Without expression," he warns, "even the greatest of loves can die."

Sternberg's triangular theory of love provides a strong foundation for his later theory of love, entitled Love as a Story. In this theory, he explains that the large numbers of unique and different love stories convey different ways of how love is understood. He believes that over time this exposure helps a person determine what love is or what it should be to them. These two theories create Sternberg's duplex theory of love.

"Personal relationships that have the greatest longevity and satisfaction are those in which partners are constantly working on sustaining intimacy and reinforcing commitment to each other."

== Measuring tools ==
The measurement of love within the framework of Sternberg’s theory is based on the Triangular Love Scale (TLS-45), developed in 1997. The TLS-45 consists of 45 items assessing the three components of the theory: intimacy, passion, and commitment. Each component is measured using 15 items. The TLS-45 is one of the most widely used measures of love and has demonstrated satisfactory psychometric properties across studies conducted in diverse cultural contexts.

In 2024, a validation study of the shortened version of the Triangular Love Scale (TLS-15) was published. The questionnaire consists of 15 items, with five items assessing each of the three components of the theory. The scale was tested across 37 language versions. The TLS-15 has demonstrated satisfactory reliability, validity, and cross-cultural measurement invariance.

== Support and criticism ==
In a study done by Michele Acker and Mark Davis in 1992, Sternberg's triangular theory of love was tested for validity. By studying a population that extended outside the typically studied group of 18- to 20-year-old college students, Acker and Davis were able to study more accurately the stages of love in people. Some criticism of Sternberg's theory of love is that although he predicted the stages of a person's love for another person, he did not specify a time or point in the relationship when the stages would evolve. He does not specify whether the different parts of love are dependent on duration of relationship or on the particular stage that relationship has reached. Acker and Davis point out that the stage and duration of the relationship are potentially important to the love component and explore them.

They find that there are no exact answers because not only each couple, but each individual in the couple experiences love in a different way. There are three perceptions of the triangular theory of love, or "the possibility of multiple triangles". Multiple triangles can exist because individuals can experience each component of love (or point of the triangle) more intensely than another. These separate triangles, according to Acker and Davis and many others, are 'real' triangles, 'ideal' triangles, and 'perceived' triangles.

These 'real' triangles are indicative of how each individual views the progress and depth of his or her relationship. The 'ideal' triangles are indicative of each individual's ideal qualities of their partner/relationship. The 'perceived' triangles are indicative of each individual's ideas of how his or her partner is viewing the relationship. If any of these three separate triangles do not look the same as a person's partner's triangles, dissatisfaction is likely to increase.

Love may not be as simple as Sternberg's triangular theory initially laid it out to be. Sternberg measured his theory on couples who were roughly the same age (mean age of 28) and whose relationship duration was roughly the same (4 to 5 years). His sample size was limited in characteristic variety. Acker and Davis announced this issue as being one of three major problems with Sternberg's theory. Romantic love, in particular, is not often the same in undergraduate level couples as couples who are not undergrads. Acker and Davis studied a sample that was older than Sternberg's sample of undergraduates. Sternberg himself did this in 1997.

The two other most obvious problems with Sternberg's theory of love are as follows. The first is the question of the separate nature of the levels of love. The second is a question of the measures that have been used to assess the three levels of love. These problems with the theory continued to be studied, for example by Lomas (2018).

In a large-scale cross-cultural study published in the Journal of Sex Research in 2020, the cultural universality of the theory was supported.

== See also ==
- Biology of romantic love
- Carte de Tendre
- Colour wheel theory of love
- Lovemap
- Passionate and companionate love
- Romantic friendship
- Theories of love
