= Colour wheel theory of love =

Love typology by J. A. Lee

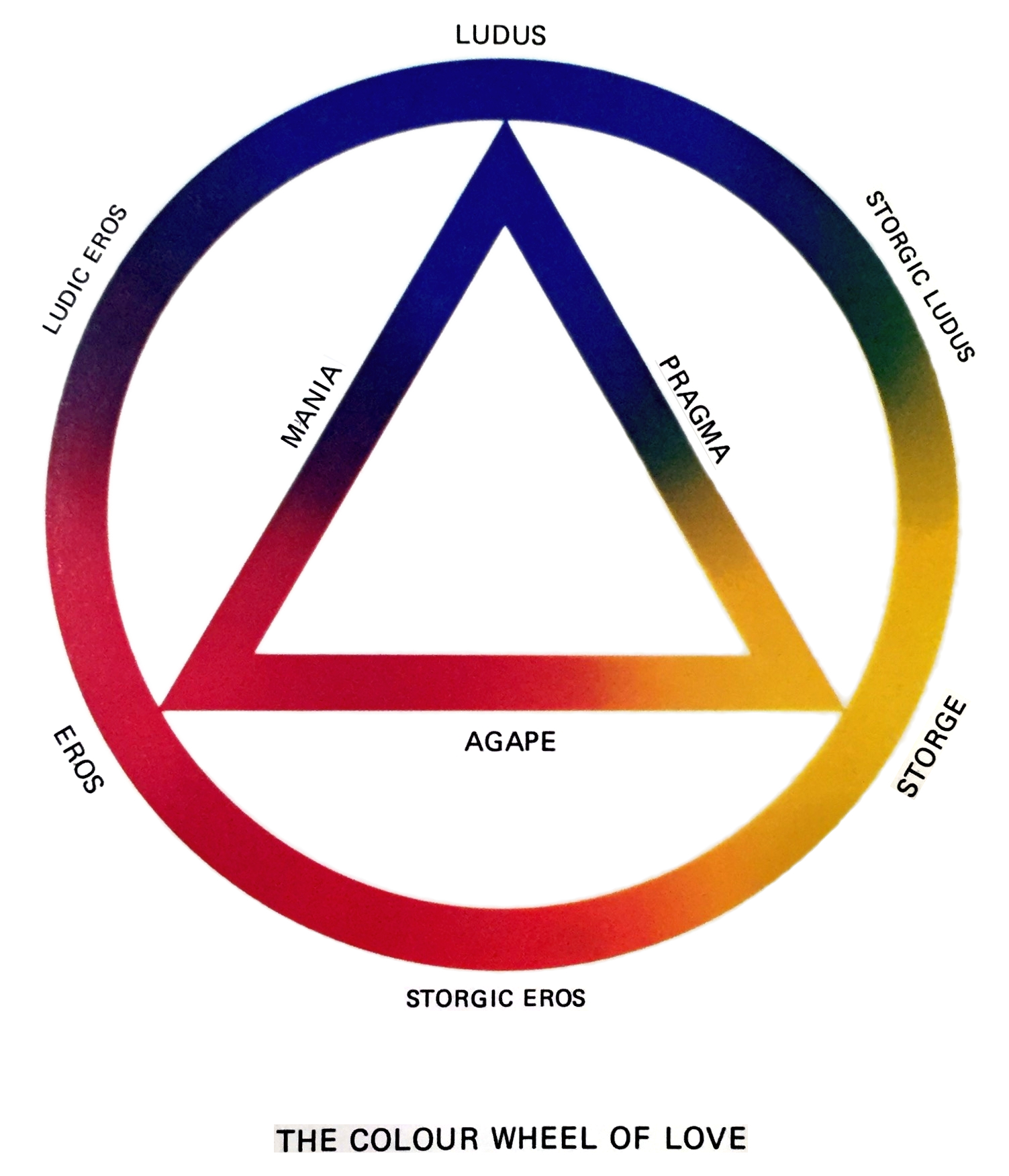
The colour wheel of love by John Alan Lee

The colour wheel theory of love was developed by the Canadian sociologist John Alan Lee to distinguish the different ways to love another person. Lee's types, termed love styles, (Note: "Love style" was also stylized by Lee as "lovestyle" and "love-style".) comprise the basic patterns or similarities which emerged in an analysis of individual love stories.

The six most common love styles are summarised briefly by the American researcher Elaine Hatfield as follows:

- Eros: love of beauty.
- Ludus: playful love.
- Storge: companionate love.
- Mania: obsessive love.
- Agape: altruistic love.
- Pragma: realistic love.

Lee's types were developed with modern scientific methods; the Greek and Latin words were borrowed as labels. Lee's original theory proposed twelve types (with even more being possible), (Note: All of the types identified by Lee (eighteen in total) are as follows. The twelve types originally proposed by Lee (and expanded on by him with profiles) are listed first. According to Lee, the six tertiary types listed underneath (and italicized) are theoretically possible, but might not actually exist. Only the three tertiary types of mania could be identified with certainty.: 1. Primary; Eros; Ludus; Storge; 2. Secondary (compound); Mania (ludus–eros); Agape (eros–storge); Pragma (ludus–storge); 3. Secondary (mixture); Ludic eros; Storgic eros; Storgic ludus; 4. Tertiary (certain); Manic eros; Manic ludus; Manic storge; 5. Tertiary (theoretical); Agapic eros; Agapic ludus; Agapic storge; Pragmatic eros; Pragmatic ludus; Pragmatic storge) although usually only the six most common are listed.

== Scientific measures ==
=== Love Story Card Sort ===
The Love Story Card Sort was a method for measuring love styles, developed by Lee himself for his initial research published in 1973.

The card sort consists of about 1500 cards, each of which describes some event, idea or emotion possible in a love relationship. The cards are then organized in sets, each with a question card and a list of possible answer cards, including a blank write-in. Thus, using some features of both interview and questionnaire, a respondent is able to tell their own personal love story—happy or unhappy—with a very large total number of possible combinations.

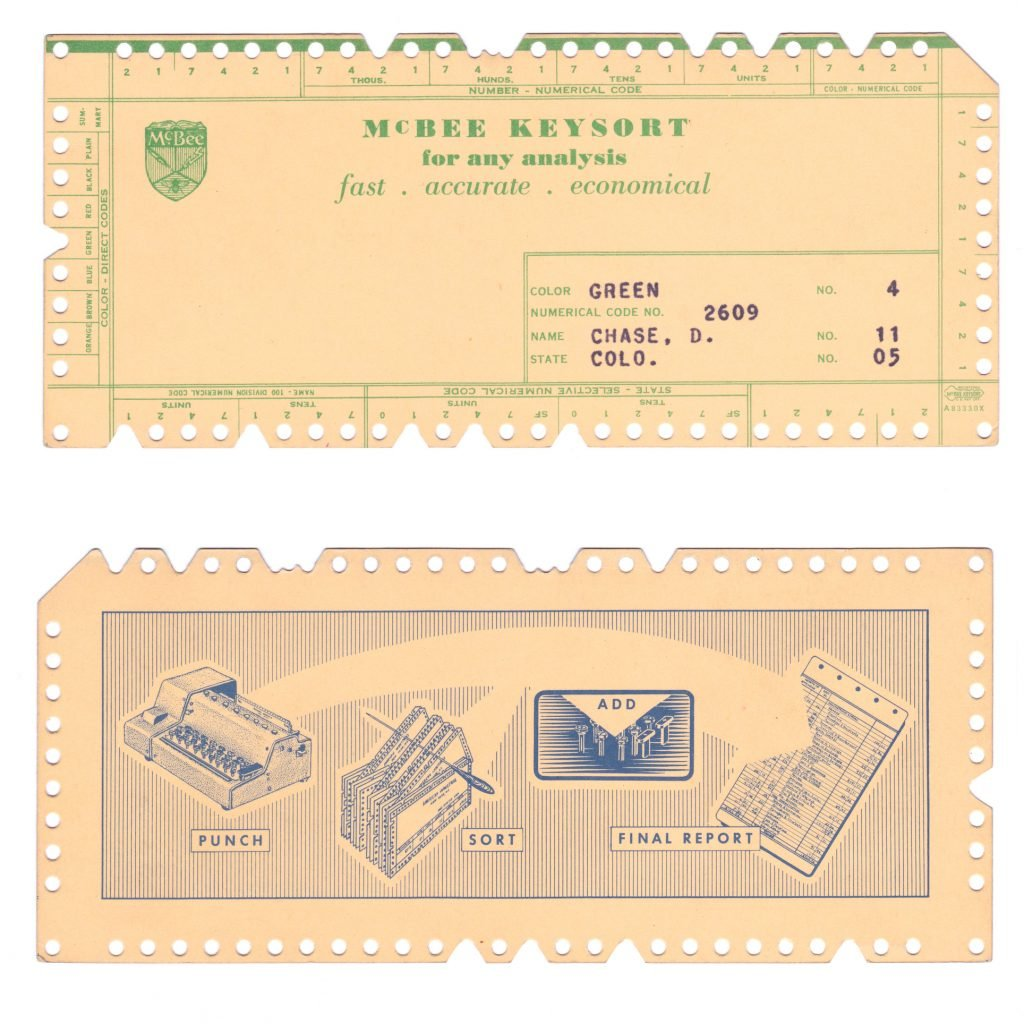
McBee cards were used by Lee in Love Story Card Sort. The card pictured has an instructional diagram.

Lee used McBee card sorting techniques to reduce the card sort items to just 206 cards which seemed to be the most important factors for distinguishing the types of love in his sample, 32 of which seemed to be particularly significant. The following examples are mentioned by Lee as being among the most predictive: (Note: All 32 of the most significant factors are listed in the full table in Colours of Love, but some specific items are mentioned in prose.)

1. Respondent believed his childhood was happy compared to that of his peers.
7. He found his thoughts obsessively preoccupied with the beloved.
12. He felt strong approval of beloved's looks at first sight.
14. Sexual intercourse occurred very early in the relationship.
31. Respondent accepted partner's lack of intensity or holding back.
— John Alan Lee, Colours of Love: An Exploration of the Ways of Loving

Lee then used a Guttman scaling technique to arrange the 112 pilot study respondents into clusters, which seemed to correspond to various love styles according to theoretical concerns. Some of these groups seemed to correspond to the love styles eros, ludus, storge and mania, as they were described in literature, while others seemed to be more transitional. However, these transitional groups (e.g. manic eros, manic ludus, storgic eros, and so on) could not be arranged along a single continuum, leading Lee to develop his triangular model of three primaries.

The factor analysis and Guttman scaling techniques used by Lee allowed him to draw up a profile of each love story as a type, along with its associated characteristics.

=== Love Attitudes Scale ===
The Love Attitudes Scale (LAS) was created in the 1980s by Clyde Hendrick and Susan Hendrick, as an extension of Lee's research; however, the LAS uses rating scales in lieu of the more complicated design of the Love Story Card Sort. Answers on the LAS are given with Likert-type scales, ranging from 1 for "strongly agree" to 5 for "strongly disagree". The items on the LAS are divided into six subscales, which correspond to the six most common love styles.

Lee initially complained about the use of rating scales, which he believed were insufficient to measure love styles, although he eventually conceded this argument to the Hendricks and accepted the ubiquity of rating scales.

Properly speaking, rather than measuring love styles, the LAS measures love attitudes. A love style is a type, while a love attitude is a variable. The goal of the Hendricks was to transform Lee's types into six dimensions, measuring the "amount" of each love style for an individual, and forming the individual's profile when taken together. Love attitude measures can then be used for hypothesis testing with other variables such as attachment styles and personality traits.

The Hendricks originally considered it an open question of what kinds of things the love styles themselves actually are—for example, enduring personality traits, or only more transient attitudes. Lee believed one could carry out different love styles with different people, simultaneously even. The Hendricks speculated that love styles have both trait and state characteristics. In 2006, the Hendricks construed love styles as "attitude/belief systems that include a variable emotional core, and possibly some linkage to personality traits".

== Primary love styles ==
=== Eros ===
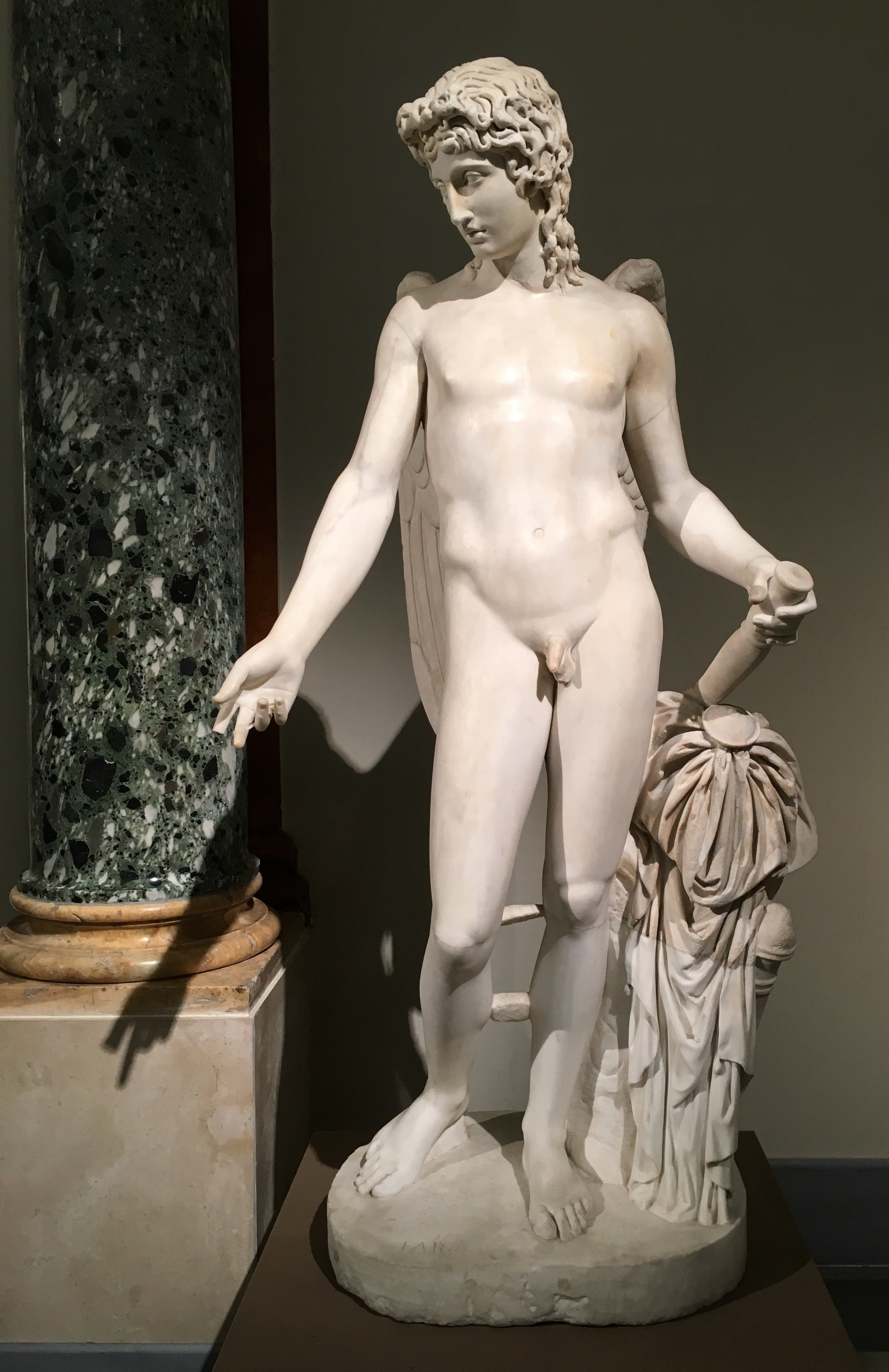
Statue of Eros

In Greek mythology, Eros was a god of love, directed towards male and female beauty, and the personification of sexual desire. His arrows are shot through the eyes of the lover. For this love style, "love is blind" may not apply. Lee describes the lover with an eros style as searching for a partner based on how closely their physical appearance matches a personal ideal. As such, eros begins with a powerful initial attraction, referred to by Stendhal as "a sudden sensation of recognition and hope". Through interviews, Lee found stories of love at first sight that survived for years of life together, therefore not just being a fiction of poets and novelists.

Typically, an erotic lover recalls a happy childhood, and is ready for love and its risks. All of Lee's respondents who were successful in their experience of eros had a solid foundation in life. They also did not become lovesick with obsessive desire or become forceful, when having to wait during the period between seeing their beloved for the first time and finding the opportunity for a relationship. Lee comments that "You cannot launch a space rocket from a swamp, nor eros from a naive, self-doubting and overly dependent personality." A successful erotic relationship is also more likely when eros is closer to being the primary conception of love for both lovers.

In contrast to modern usage which tends to equate erotic with sexual, Lee intended to strengthen the original Greek meaning of eros—involving mental or ideal properties, as in Plato's original conception of platonic love. An erotic lover seeks their specific ideal of "the beautiful", but is not only interested in sex. As one of Lee's respondents puts it, "Our sex [...] was never the most important thing and it's certainly not the thing that holds us together. We make love; sex doesn't make us love."

Eros, as well as mania, corresponds to concepts like falling in love, passionate love, and romantic love.

The LAS eros subscale has items such as:

- "My lover and I have the right physical 'chemistry' between us."
- "My lover fits my ideal standards of physical beauty/handsomeness."

The eros love attitude has been positively associated with secure attachment and the personality traits agreeableness, conscientiousness, and extraversion, but negatively associated with neuroticism. In modern research, the LAS eros subscale has also been sometimes used to measure the intensity of romantic love, although it was not intended for this.

=== Ludus ===
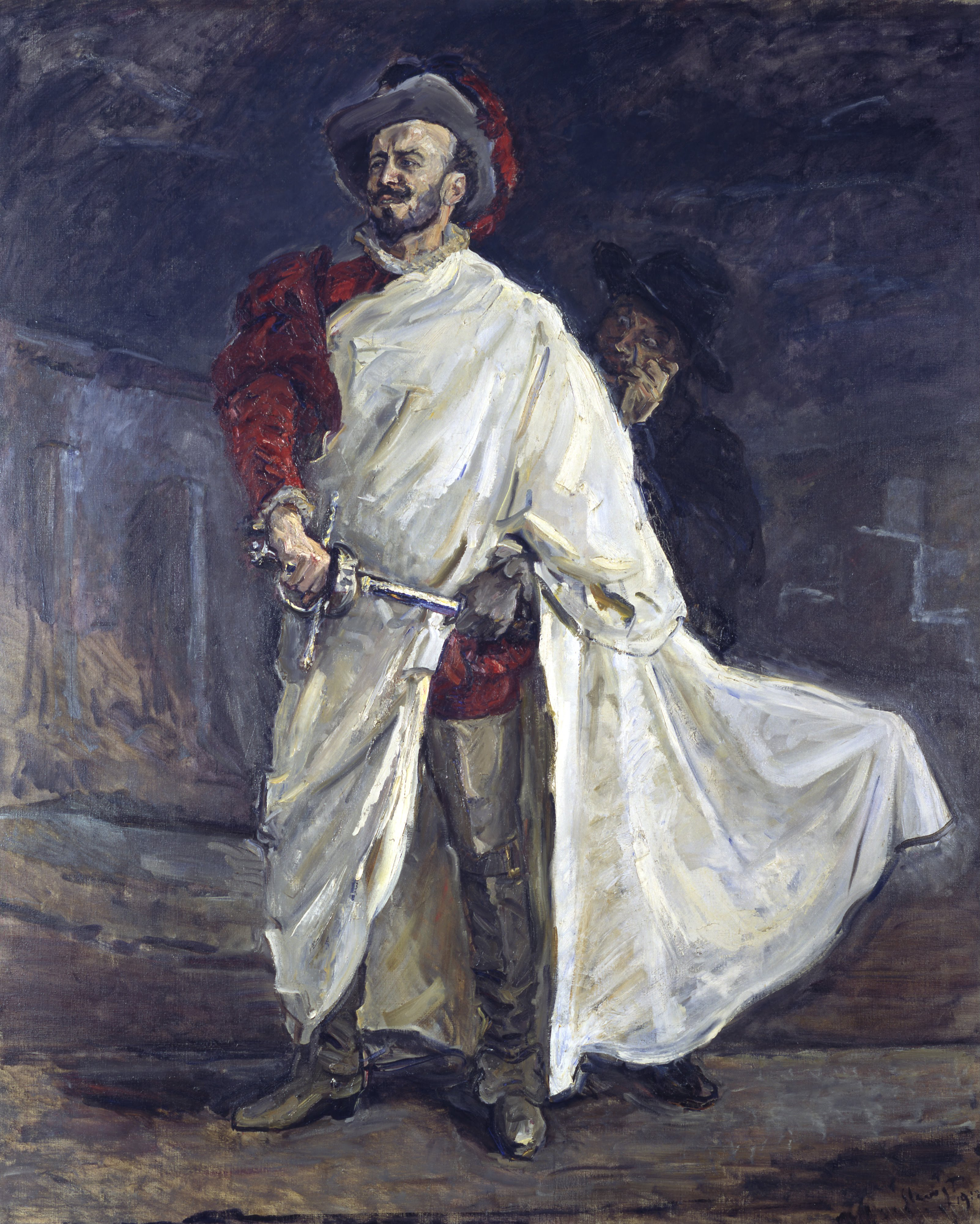
Don Juan

"Ludus" is the Latin word for "play" or "game". It was adapted by Lee from amor ludens, a term for playful love used by the poet Ovid, who advised lovers to enjoy love as a pleasant and unserious pastime. A ludic lover does not fall in love or become dependent, and refuses to allow their lover to become overly attached. A ludic lover has no ideal type of beloved in mind. They are pluralistic, and may play with several partners simultaneously; the "game" might be played openly by warning a lover they have alternatives, or with the deception of promising a false commitment. Other types of lovers may dismiss ludus as not even love at all, or a subtle form of seduction.

A typical ludic lover recalls an average childhood, but is often frustrated with adult life, and unwilling to "settle down" and commit. Like eros, ludus also requires self-assurance to be successful; unlike eros, however, the ludic lover prefers to swim in "shallower water", convincing himself or herself they do not "need" other people. A ludic lover who is unable to stay detached runs the risk of becoming lovesick with the tertiary love style manic ludus.

Don Juan is a famous literary example of the ludus love style, with James Bond also being similar.

The LAS ludus subscale has items such as:

- "I try to keep my lover a little uncertain about my commitment to him/her."
- "I have sometimes had to keep two of my lovers from finding out about each other."

The ludus love attitude has been positively associated with avoidant attachment, maladaptive psychological defence mechanisms, and the personality trait neuroticism, but negatively associated with agreeableness and conscientiousness.

=== Storge ===
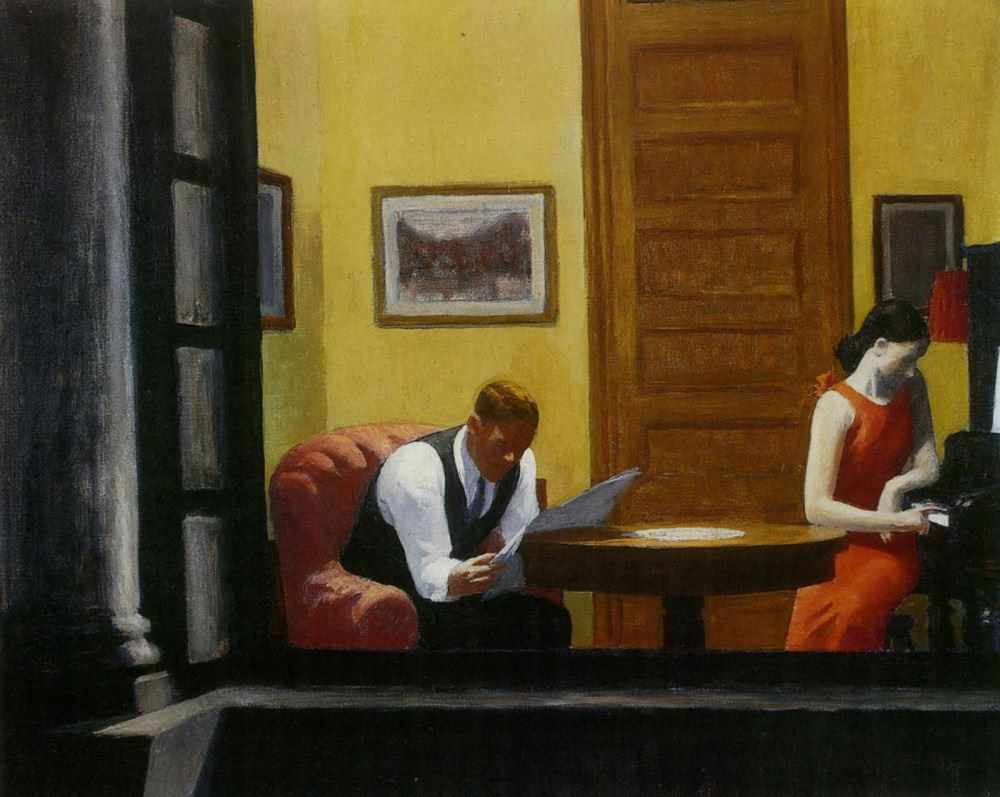
Room in New York, by Edward Hopper

"Storge" is the Ancient Greek word for that loving affection which develops between family members or friends. The storge love style is a form of companionate love, beginning as friendship and growing only more gradually into a committed relationship. Such love might occur between childhood neighbors, or longtime school friends. It is possible, however, for a storgic relationship to occur between strangers if they share a similar background, and the quality of experience is right as the relationship develops. Storgic love comes naturally with time and the mutual enjoyment of shared activities, as one grows accustomed to another.

Typical storgic lovers grew up with supportive families or communities, are satisfied with life, and expect love to be a kind of special friendship with more than the usual time spent together. They have no ideal beloved in mind, and instead happen to meet others through mutual activities. Self-disclosure comes slowly in a storgic relationship, but there is an expectation of commitment. The goals of the storge love style are marriage, home and children. However, the shared activities (e.g. at church or a club) are likely to continue in a storgic relationship—unlike in pragma, where the shared activities are more of a means to an end, and dropped after meeting the partner.

Storge has a "lower profile" than eros, ludus or mania, being more dispassionate, and is sometimes hard to distinguish from ordinary friendship. According to Lee, storge is "without fever or folly" and "rarely the stuff of dramatic works or romantic novels". Those who prefer a more passionate form of love, such as eros or mania, may find storge to be on the dull side. The storgic lover may also be puzzled by those partners who expect love to be more dramatic. Mutually storgic lovers do not spend time gazing into each other's eyes, or saying "I love you"; such thoughts and expressions are usually avoided.

The LAS storge subscale has items such as:

- "I did not realize that I was in love until I actually had been for some time. (It is hard to say exactly where friendship ends and love begins.)"
- "Love is really a deep friendship, not a mysterious, mystical emotion."

The storge love attitude has been positively associated with the personality traits conscientiousness and extraversion, but negatively associated with neuroticism. The Hendricks had predicted a relationship between storge and agreeableness, but it failed to reach statistical significance. The storge love attitude has also been negatively associated with secure attachment (meaning insecure), although it is regarded as an otherwise positive love attitude.

== Secondary love styles ==
=== Mania ===
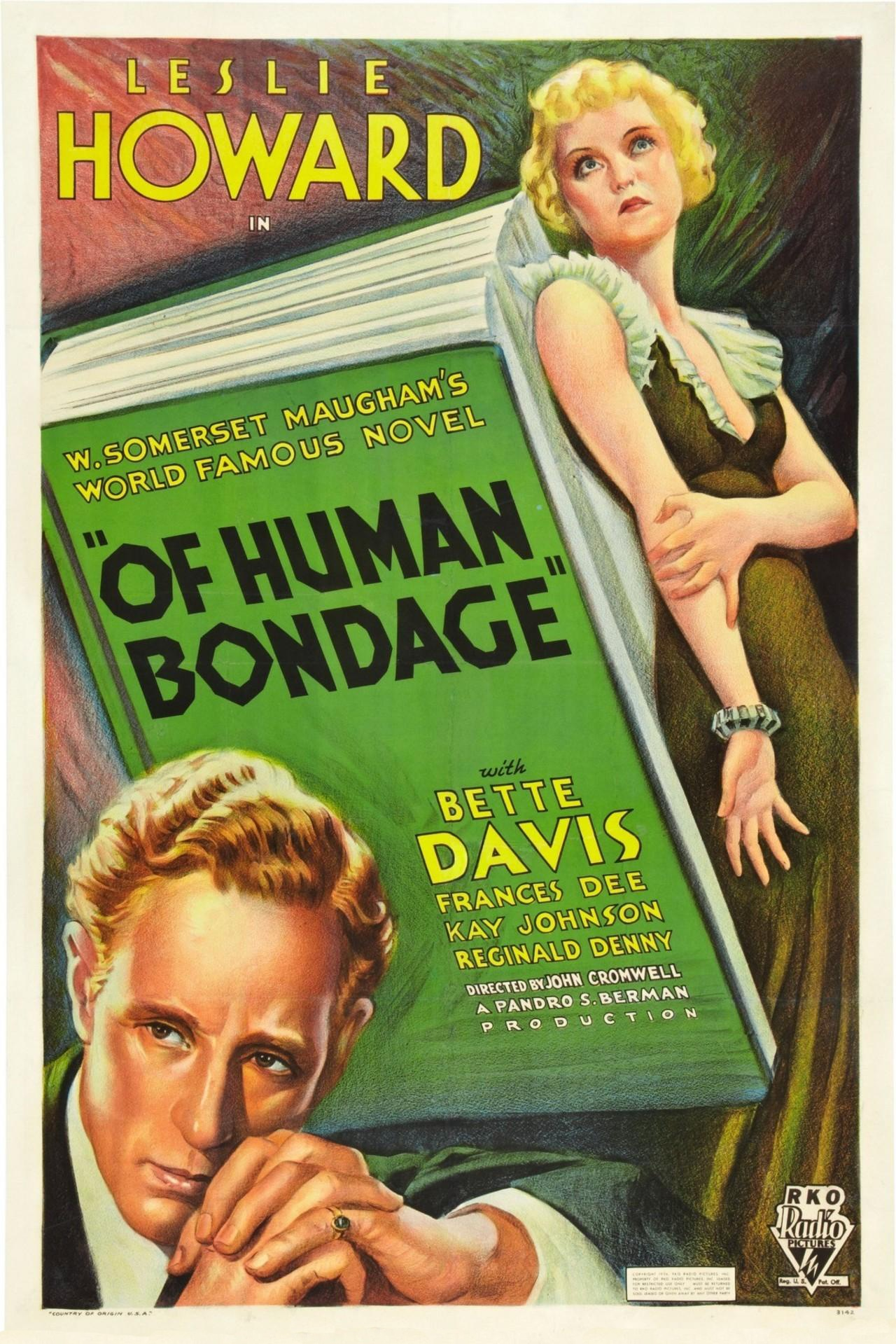
Movie poster for Of Human Bondage (1934) W. Somerset Maugham's novel Of Human Bondage contains a depiction of typical mania: Philip's love for Mildred. Philip reports preconditions for mania (an unhappy childhood, loneliness, discontent) and becomes obsessed with Mildred despite finding her initially unattractive.

"Mania" is taken by Lee from the Ancient Greek phrase theia mania: the madness from the gods. A manic lover is obsessively preoccupied, jealous, and needs reassurance of being loved in return. According to Lee, "Mania can become almost an addiction nearly impossible for the addict to end on his own initiative."

A typical manic lover recalls their childhood as unhappy, and they're usually lonely, dissatisfied adults. They're anxious to fall in love; however, they're unsure of which physical type they prefer. Because they're unsure of who to fall in love with, they often fall in love with somebody quite inappropriate (a stranger, or even somebody they initially dislike) and project onto them the qualities they want but don't actually have. According to Lee, only manic lovers typically "crystallize" (as Stendhal described it) and ignore shortcomings and flaws in their beloved.

Mania is often the first love style of a young person, but others may not experience it until middle age—for example, after a marriage has lost interest. A cycle of manic loves is often caused by a desperate need to be in love, the cause of which the manic lover must locate and remedy to break free.

In the colour wheel analogy, mania is a secondary compound love style, made by combining the primaries eros and ludus. According to Lee's research data, manic lovers showed an intensity comparable to eros, yet in many ways they did not even really "like" their beloved at all. Additionally, they exhibited self-control of emotional expression and attempts to elicit a response from their partner similar to ludus. However, mania also contained qualities not contained in either primary type: emotions extreme enough to be self-defeating, an inability to enjoy mutuality, and almost always an unhappy ending with a bitter recovery.

Ludus and mania have a "fatal attraction" for one another; it's surprisingly common, but not a good match for happy, mutual love. Lee recommends that only a beloved who is typical of eros would be a suitable match for a manic lover, being more likely to tolerate them until their mania turns into a more stable love.

Mania has been compared to obsessive love, love addiction, and limerence.

Manic love is the tragic theme of popular romance stories such as Tristan and Iseult, Romeo and Juliet, and The Sorrows of Young Werther. Lee associates the ideology of courtly love with the mania love style in particular. According to Lee, Western culture came to view mania as a legitimate basis for mate selection through the courtly and romantic traditions. This replaced the medieval Christian doctrine that marriage should focus on family values and child care. Lee stated in 1973 that mania was "the most prevalent ideology of love in the modern world".

The LAS mania subscale has items such as:

- "When my lover doesn't pay attention to me, I feel sick all over."
- "When I am in love, I have trouble concentrating on anything else."

The mania love attitude has been positively associated with attachment anxiety, maladaptive psychological defence mechanisms, and the personality trait neuroticism.

=== Agape ===
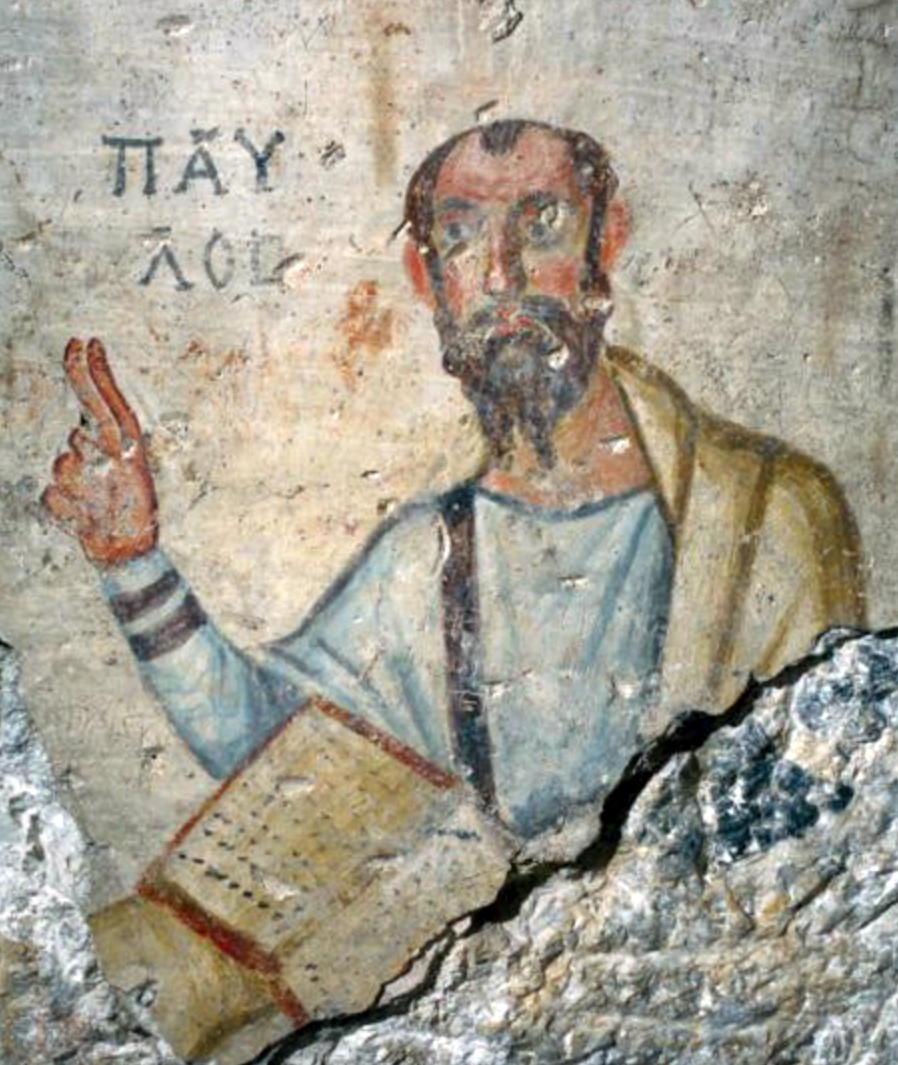
Paul the Apostle

"Agape" is the Ancient Greek term used by Paul the Apostle when writing to the early Christians in the First Epistle, saying "Love is patient; love is kind; love is not envious or boastful or arrogant or rude." (Note: Christianity came to use the word "agape" in a different sense, however, than the ancient Greeks, who actually used it to mean loving in a more general sense; in modern Greece the word is also used to say "I love you".) The term has also been considered an alias for the concept of compassionate love. The agape love style is selfless and altruistic; an agapic lover considers it their duty to love, without any expectation of reciprocity in return.

An agapic lover may be content with only very little of their partner's time, or even willing to let the partner go if they would be happier with somebody else. Consequently, agape is the least common love style practiced in actual relationships, existing more as an ideal most attainable in celibacy. Lee admits he found no unqualified examples of the agape love style in his sample, only brief episodes in relationships that were otherwise selfish. One man, for example, bowed out gracefully to a rival to save his beloved the pain of deciding between them, but was later delighted when she returned to him. Agapic lovers are generally older and more mature—a love governed by reason or will, rather than attraction.

In the colour wheel analogy, agape is a secondary compound love style, made by combining the primaries eros and storge. Saint Augustine was the first to recognize this when he wrote of a need to restrain eros, because of a belief that only God was deserving of such a union. Therefore, erotic love is redirected by agape through submission to God (caritas), and a kind of generalized invocation of storge in being a good neighbor, servant, and friend. Lee, however, states that the compound nature of the agape love style must remain only a theory, due to the lack of real life examples to demonstrate it.

In The Sound of Music, Maria's relationship with the Captain starts as an agapic expression of religious duty, then transitions to storgic eros as her love becomes affiliative.

The LAS agape subscale has items such as:

- "I cannot be happy unless I place my lover's happiness before my own."
- "I am usually willing to sacrifice my own wishes to let my lover achieve his/hers."

The agape love attitude has been positively associated with secure attachment.

=== Pragma ===
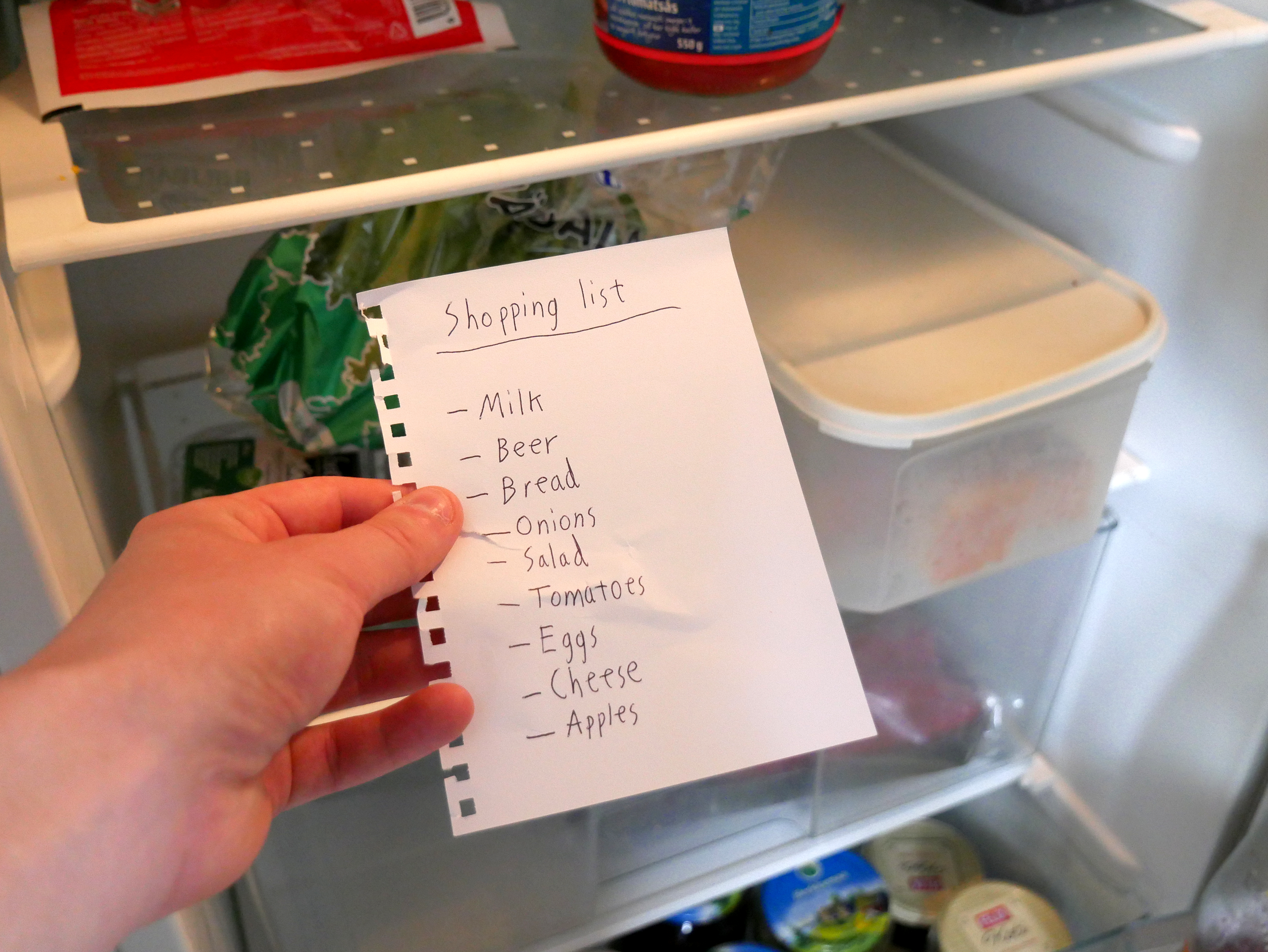
A shopping list for groceries

"Pragma" is the Ancient Greek root of the word "pragmatic". A pragmatic lover has a mental "shopping list" of the traits they desire in a partner. The list may include physical traits; however, unlike eros, there is no special emphasis on this. Rather, a pragmatic lover emphasises compatibility, searching for qualities which tend to be demographic or personality traits—religious, political, or social class background, age, education, income, hobbies, favourite sports, and so on. The pragma love style only requires this kind of compatibility, and that the relationship works well, satisfying the needs of both partners.

A pragmatic lover is often an adult who feels their personal goals can be attained through effort. Finding a compatible partner is only a practical problem to be solved by getting to know a potential partner, and avoiding warning signs or a hasty commitment. They are aware of their own "market value" as a mate and know who is "out of their league". The pragmatic search for a partner is a conscious activity, first of determining the characteristics one finds desirable, and then determining which potential partners appear to have them. A pragmatic lover can produce a list of these characteristics, and rate their importance from high to low.

In the colour wheel analogy, pragma is a secondary compound love style, made by combining the primaries ludus and storge. Like ludus, the pragmatic search is a conscious and deliberate effort, and the pragmatic lover tends to control and manipulate the process as a relationship develops. However, unlike ludus, the pragmatic lover wants to settle down in a satisfying long-term relationship, like storge.

Pragma is the love style of arranged marriage.

The LAS pragma subscale has items such as:

- "A main consideration in choosing a lover is how he/she reflects on my family."
- "One consideration in choosing a partner is how he/she will reflect on my career."

The pragma love attitude has been positively associated with avoidant attachment.

== Other love styles ==
=== Secondary mixture love styles ===
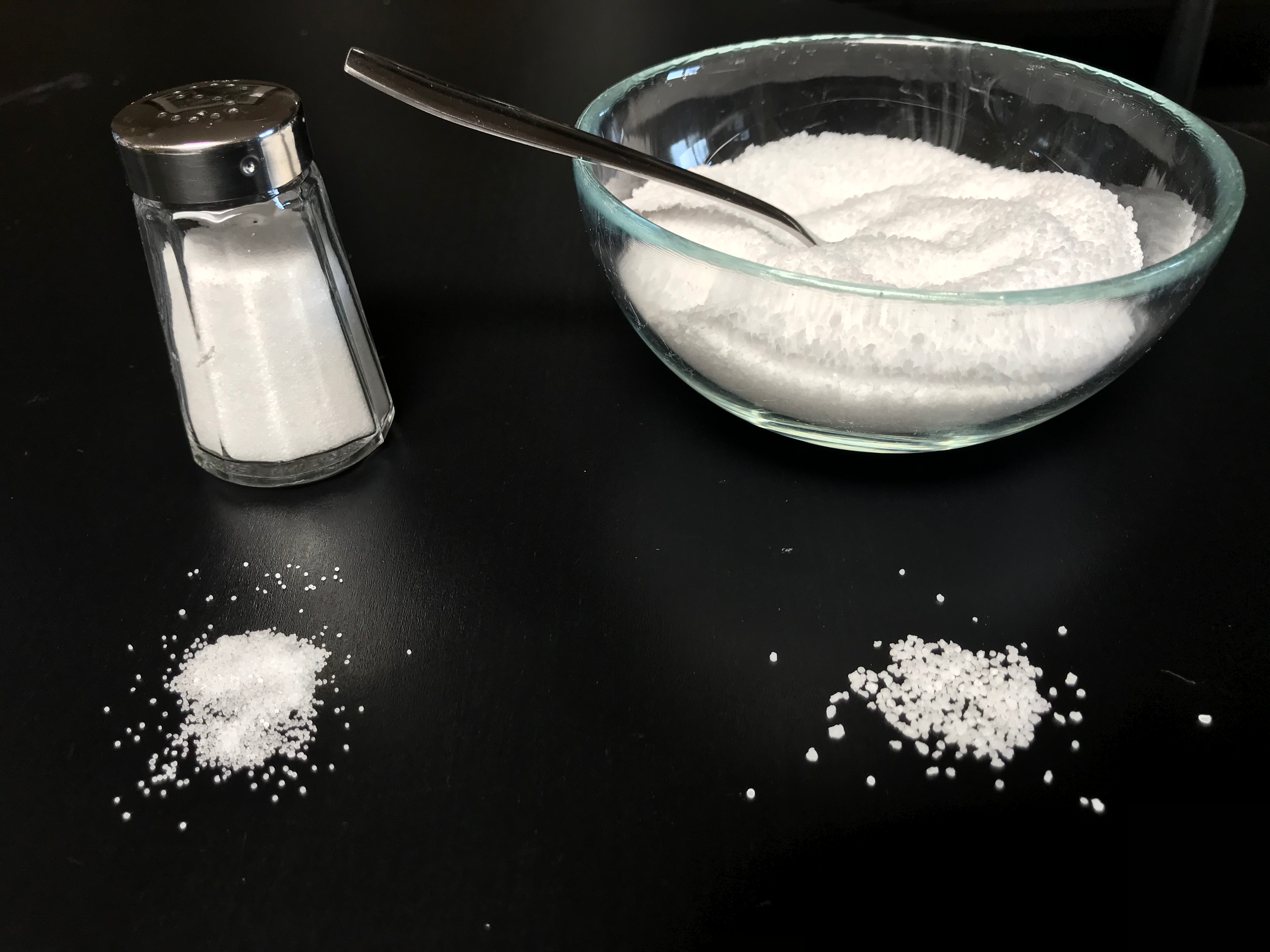
Table salt (NaCl)—a chemical compound

Salad dressing—a mixture whose ingredients will eventually separate

The colour analogy is further expanded on by Lee with an analogy from chemistry: a mixture is made from two substances in some proportion which retain their individual properties, whereas a compound is a new substance made from a chemical union which may even have a different property from its ingredients. (Lee gives the example of table salt, which is actually a compound of two poisons: chlorine and sodium.)

In an analogous way, Lee observed that some of his love styles seemed to have similar primary constituents (according to his data) while being otherwise unlike each other. Mania, agape, and pragma are defined as secondary compounds; additionally, a secondary mixture exists which corresponds to each of the same primary constituents unblended. For example, mania is a compound of eros and ludus (taking on a new character), while ludic eros is a mixture of the same primaries.

==== Ludic eros ====
Ludic eros is a secondary mixture of the primaries ludus and eros. Ludic-erotic lovers do have clearly-defined ideal images of their beloved, but their plurality resembles ludus. A purely erotic lover has a more demanding ideal. A ludic-erotic lover maintains the detachment of ludus in their relationships (retaining the ability to break up if satisfaction wanes), but may gain a reputation in his or her community if a lack of commitment leaves a trail of broken hearts. According to Lee, balancing between eros and ludus requires self-esteem, and prior experience with relationships. A ludic-erotic lover is in danger of slipping into the torment of mania, if their focus is unrequited, or they become frantic over the lost potential for the intensity of pure erotic rapport.

The claims of matrimony are so heavy that it takes two to carry them—sometimes three.

— Alexandre Dumas

Because ludic-erotic lovers are not prepared for a life-long commitment to a single partner, they generally remain unmarried. However, some societies have incorporated practices within the institution of marriage which approximate it by allowing sexual partners on the side—open marriage being the most relevant to ludic eros. Lee says that maintaining one central marriage relationship while engaging in a series of affairs which are not merely ludic (cynical and manipulative), but fully ludic-erotic, would demand a great deal of "maturity" and ground rules between the married couple. Lee suggests that for such an arrangement to work, the partners must be committed by a mutual definition of love; however, among his respondents, the most stable open marriages were actually based on this mutual definition of love as pragma.

Typical ludic-erotic lovers believe they had an average or happy childhood, or are "over it" if it was unhappy, and are content with life. They are able to maintain a balance of casual detachment in relationships (while still feeling care and concern for a lover), show intense feelings in a way which does not communicate exclusivity, and are not jealous or possessive. They believe love is fun, but not "all-important". They enjoy love, but are not obsessed with the thoughts of any particular beloved.

The adventures of Jacques Casanova de Seingalt are one classic example of ludic eros. Casanova succumbed to mania in one instance, for Henriette, although this was unusual.

==== Storgic eros ====
Becoming truly unselfish in love, while at the same time adequately loving any given person, is as rare as saintliness.

— John Alan Lee

Storgic eros is a secondary mixture of the primaries storge and eros. The love style emerged in Lee's data as a group of stories which seemed to come close to the ideal of agape (the compound equivalent), but fell short due to "a certain selfishness which seems almost essential" when two humans are concerned with their primary relationship above all others. The Christian definition of agape expects universal brotherhood—independent of the kind of mutual reciprocity which is the focus of eros and storge.

Storgic eros is characterized by initial attraction, but this is distinguished by the absence of the physical symptoms of excitement present in eros. Lee's storgic-erotic respondents also experienced little jealousy or anxiety over their initial feelings being reciprocated. These lovers reported intense psychological intimacy, but did not have an ideal image of their beloved, and reported elements of affection and patience more typical of storge. Gentle, warm feelings are more valued than sexual intimacy. If a relationship became long-lasting, the storgic-erotic lover did become dependent on their lover's reciprocal feelings (falling short of the agapic ideal); however, this differed from both eros (which is upset by even just a few days of separation) and storge (which is less self-conscious about the relationship).

La Promenade, by Pierre-Auguste Renoir

According to Lee, mutually erotic lovers can be identified by their intimate rapport, involving a constant flow of touches and other cues between them, even in public. Mutually storgic lovers seem to pay scarcely any attention to each other by contrast. A storgic-erotic couple is somewhere in between, "quite conscious" of being lovers, but not to the point of excluding the onlooker with the intensity of their attention towards one another.

Typical storgic-erotic lovers feel their childhood was meaningful, whether or not it was happy, and are fairly content with life. They have no favourite type, and feel that loving is a duty, something which everyone is worthy of. They begin their love with this duty towards their partner's needs, and do not compel reciprocation.

A representative story told by Lee was of a man who hired a woman to be a housekeeper, after their respective married partners had left them. For more than a year, they shared a home, caring for children from their previous relationships, with no expression of feelings or sexual contact. In hindsight, they admitted there was probably physical attraction between them, although it was initially restrained; mutual play with their children brought them to be closer, along with a feeling of "mental communion", and a growing respect for each other.

==== Storgic ludus ====
Our romances were untroubled and unclouded; there was no needling, nagging or quarreling—after all what would be the point of extramarital affairs if they were the same as marriage?

— Stephen Vizinczey

Storgic ludus is a secondary mixture of the primaries storge and ludus. Compared to the compound pragma, when storge and ludus merely mix, a ludic disinterest in marriage remains: the result is a short-term relationship marked by convenience, in which the two participants show more (storgic) familiarity and concern than would be typical of ludus. Storgic ludus also differs from pragma (and eros), because the storgic-ludic lover recognizes the inherent substitutability of their partner (resembling ludus), rather than matching an imagined ideal.

Storgic ludus emphasizes affairs, and although it can be a preferred style, it is often a second choice for lovers who prefer a different style for something more enduring. It might be exemplified in an affair shared between a married boss and his secretary, or a university student and her coach. In one case, Lee encountered a couple whose marriage was actually based on a storgic-ludic relationship: things were kept "legal for business reasons", but the couple continued to be open to permitting each other's affairs.

Unlike other types of affairs (e.g. ludic or ludic-erotic) a storgic-ludic affair is made as discrete as possible to avoid unwanted consequences. They might be intense in private, but they restrain their expression in public and expect their partner to do likewise. A naturally pragmatic lover who finds "supplementary" excitement in affairs would tend towards storgic ludus, because keeping the security of their pragmatic marriage (with a compatible partner) would be a top priority. As with ludic eros, open marriage is a possible arrangement, with a basic difference that pragmatic marriage partners who allow such a mistress or lover on the side would not normally share their adventures with each other; they would rather "live and let live" and only bring things up in the event of a crisis.

Typical storgic-ludic lovers are self-reliant, experienced in relationships, and do not feel a special need to be in love. Their preference is for lovers who are socially acceptable in their own lifestyle, rather than for physical or biographical qualities, and they tend to begin with a partner who is already familiar. They are not jealous or possessive, and will break off a relationship if the partner shows these qualities, particularly if a more valuable relationship is being threatened.

=== Tertiary love styles ===
A tertiary love style is made by combining a primary love style with one of the secondary compounds. Nine are theoretically possible, but only three (varieties of mania) could be identified by Lee with certainty. In some cases, he suspected the other combinations do not exist, such as "pragmatic eros" and "agapic ludus", both of which seem to be contradictory. According to Lee's theory, a primary does not combine with a secondary mixture, because that would just be all three primaries together.

A further level of "quaternary" love styles is also theoretically possible, but they would tend towards being nondescript.

==== Manic eros ====
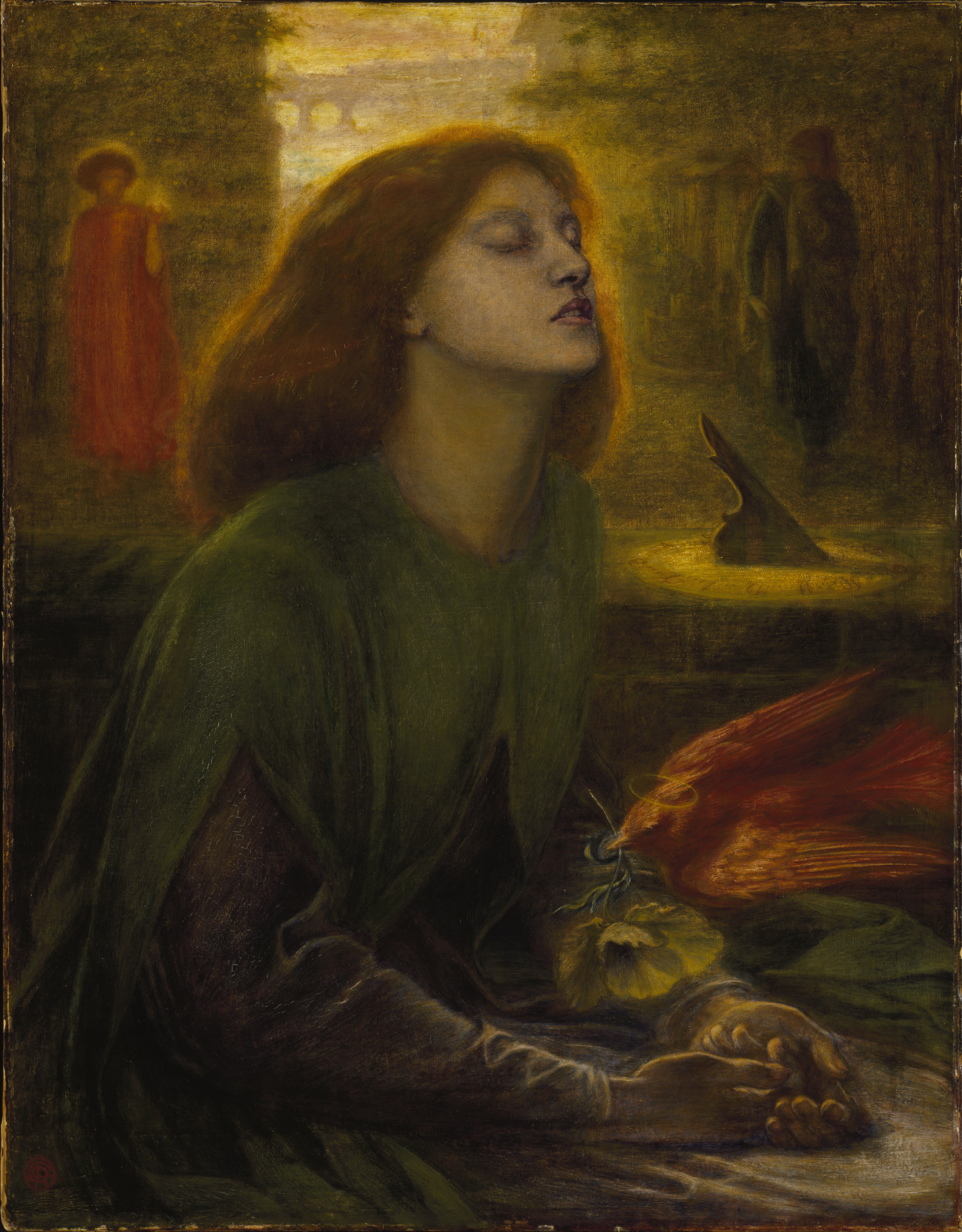
Beata Beatrix—painting by Dante Gabriel Rossetti The Italian poet Dante Alighieri's unrequited long-term limerence (or lovesickness) for Beatrice began with a powerful physical attraction. Lee believed it was only permanent because it was unconsummated, however: had they married, "he would soon have grown tired of her".

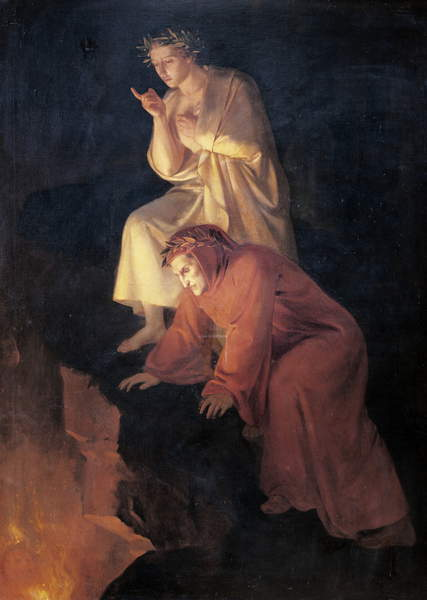
Dante and Virgil visiting Hell, as depicted in Dante's Inferno—painting by Rafael Flores

Manic eros is a tertiary love style which seemed to be more "transitional", where the lover "was moving either toward a more stable eros or toward full-blown mania".

Some manic-erotic lovers were more like typical erotic lovers, showing none of the predisposing factors of mania, but were under some kind of a strain. For example, the beloved's response diminished, there was physical separation, or threat from a rival, and the relationship was left uncertain. Such an increase in uncertainty led to stronger manic qualities in Lee's respondents. In manic eros, the lover becomes more preoccupied, anxious, and depressed, and this invades and undermines their other activities. They show signs of desperation, and attempts to compel reciprocation. When the original problems are resolved, the manic symptoms tend to subside, returning to more typical eros.

Other cases of manic eros were lovers more predisposed to mania, unlikely to gain erotic rapport, even absent sources of anxiety. Some of them were lucky enough to have a partner with a primarily erotic style, who could help them "over the hump" to eros, but most of them were "struggling unaided". To some extent their relationships resembled eros, because they tended to believe the sincerity of their partner (rather than doubt it), did not compel them, and had some capacity for sensual rapport, but this was undermined by features of mania like anxiety, negative preoccupation, and overreaction to unrequited attention.

Compared to a purely manic lover, a manic-erotic lover has a more clear image of their ideal beloved, and a greater correspondence between this ideal and their actual beloved. They may doubt, but not despise themselves, and are less likely to submit to abuse or remake themselves to please their beloved.

==== Manic ludus ====
Manic ludus is a tertiary love style whose condition combined seemingly contradictory aspects of mania and ludus (preoccupation and detachment). Normally, for successful ludic love, the lover practices a level of self-sufficiency and detachment—really considering their beloveds to be relatively interchangeable, and unafraid of being alone between love affairs. A lover who begins to suffer from doubts and anxieties will have this undermine their detachment; they will become preoccupied and possessive, as in mania, and eventually lose their ludic ability to drop the current partner.

A manic-ludic lover would like to be a casual, easygoing playboy, but there is a gap between their ability to do this and their ability to control their emotions. If their partner shows disinterest, they will hang on, at a point when a ludic lover would immediately drop the partner by comparison. If the partner comes on strong instead, a manic-ludic lover may revive their vanity, and then become most likely to move on to somebody else.

Although a manic-ludic lover comparatively lacks ludic independence and a true ability to manipulate their relationships, they do not reach the extreme dependency of mania: feeling that life is "hardly worth living" without the beloved, and even putting up with abuse rather than break up.

==== Manic storge ====
Manic storge is a tertiary love style in which "a sudden storm of emotions" overtook a normally unassuming storgic lover, making him or her "painfully, intensely aware of 'being in love'". The sudden discharge might be precipitated by the partner showing dissatisfaction or the presence of a romantic rival, and can permanently alter the relationship or even cause its demise.

In some instances, the newly intense feelings can bring the lover closer in rapport and commitment, while in others it may render the lover temporarily incapable of action. In cases which involved a rival, several could only silently hope their partner's interest was a phase, unable to openly express their love and desire.

== Biology ==
Dopamine

Serotonin

In 2007, researchers from the University of Pavia led by Enzo Emanuele investigated the relation between love attitudes and the dopamine and serotonin pathways, by examining the association with polymorphisms in several neurotransmitter genes. This study found that the eros love attitude was associated with the DRD2 (dopamine receptor) TaqI A genotypes. A trend was observed in the study for higher scores on eros according to the number of A1 alleles, which has previously been associated with lower DRD2 density. (D2 receptors are inhibitory.) Such a difference is hypothesized to result in a deficiency such that the reward is enhanced from pleasant experiences, consistent with some of the "addictive" features of eros, such as a need for daily contact and a desire for exclusivity. Additionally, the mania love attitude was associated with the 5HT2A (serotonin receptor) C516T genotype, which has also been associated with obsessive–compulsive disorder.

In behavioral genetics, one tool which is valuable for determining genetic influence is the twin study, which compares identical twins (monozygotic, who are genetically identical) and fraternal twins (dizygotic, who are only 50% genetically related, like other siblings). The differences between the two types of twins are used to estimate how much of a given trait is heritable (how much the individual differences in a group, i.e. variance, can be accounted for by genetic differences between individuals), and how much is environmental. Environmental contribution is further split between shared environment (which makes family members more similar) and nonshared environment (which makes them different, but for mathematical reasons also includes measurement error).

In 1994, a twin study co-authored by Phillip Shaver investigated the genetic and environmental influence on love attitudes. This study found that individual differences in love attitudes are almost exclusively due to environmental influence, with genetic factors having very little influence for most love attitudes (from most-to-least heritable: mania, storge, pragma & eros), and even no influence at all for others (ludus & agape). The authors interpret the result as meaning that love styles may be influenced by one's childhood familial environment (for shared environment) and unique experiences with parents, peers, adolescent and adult lovers, and so on (for nonshared environment). Of these, the influence from the nonshared environment was larger than the shared environment.

== See also ==
- Attachment theory – Psychological ethological theory
- Greek words for love – Group of concepts in Ancient Greek philosophy
- Love – Strong, positive emotional/mental states
- Passionate and companionate love – Two basic love feelings
- Romance – Love focused on feelings
- The Four Loves – 1960 book by C. S. Lewis
- Theories of love – Psychological and sociological theories
- Triangular theory of love – Psychological theory by Robert Sternberg
