= Infatuation =

Intense, irrational attraction

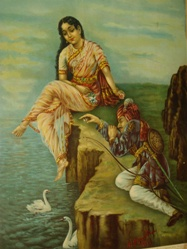
An illustrated depiction of Mahābhārata character Ulupi becoming infatuated with Arjuna

Infatuation refers to being "in love" or intensely love smitten, with possible connotations of youth, irrationality, foolishness, or capriciousness. An individual may be considered infatuated with a person they do not know well yet, or whom others view as unsuitable. In the triangular theory of love, infatuation refers to romantic passion in the absence of intimacy or commitment, as in love at first sight and limerence. A simple infatuation which is more short-lived may be referred to as a crush, or puppy love in adolescence. Infatuation might also be compared to the honeymoon phase of a relationship.

The word infatuated appeared in the mid-17th century, taking its root from fatuus (Latin, meaning "foolish"), and has carried the connotation of irrationality ever since. The psychology professor Dorothy Tennov considered "infatuation" to be among pejorative labels for intense romantic attachments.

== Features ==
Individuals who are infatuated may exhibit a variety of psychological features, for example:

- They experience persistent, intrusive thoughts about the love object; these might be either fantasy-like, or take the form of anxious rumination which is distracting and distressing. These thoughts may flow continually, alternating over the possibility that one's feelings are reciprocated or not, contributing to the overall volatility of the emotional experience. At the height of obsession, individuals who are infatuated can spend upwards of 85% of their waking hours doting or brooding in this fashion.
- They idealize the love object, worshipping their positive qualities, and responding only indifferently to negatives. This is also called crystallization or positive illusions.
- In general, infatuation is directed towards only one potential partner at a time.

The more acute an infatuation is, the more likely it is that these features will be present.

Scientific data collection on the psychological, behavioral and physiological traits of infatuation largely began with Dorothy Tennov's now-classic 1979 book, Love and Limerence. Tennov invented the term "limerence" to refer to a state of infatuation involving obsessional features, because according to in-person interviews conducted by her, terms like "infatuation" and "being in love" were not actually useful for identifying which mental states people were talking about. Informants Tennov spoke to would claim to be "in love" (or even speak of "obsession") while not reporting intrusive thoughts, or they would claim to be "in love" with several people at a time—therefore having wildly different impressions of the meaning of words, depending on whether or not they had actually experienced the state. A survey reported in 2025 indicated that 64% of people had experienced the state, and only 32% experienced distress that made it "hard to enjoy life".

Other researchers such as Helen Fisher and Lisa Diamond have continued to use "infatuation" to refer to the state identified by Tennov, despite Tennov's objection over semantic ambiguity.

== Love versus infatuation ==
Classically, infatuation is said to be contrasted with love, in a "love versus infatuation" distinction. In this type of distinction, the implication is that infatuation is supposedly "counterfeit", or often "mistaken" for love. Love might be described as "true" love, "mature" love, "real", or "realistic" love.

Features of the two may be presented as dichotomous, for example:

- Infatuation is based in fantasy, whereas love is based in reality.
- Infatuation is shallow, whereas love is deep.
- Infatuation is intense while a relationship is new, whereas love develops over time.
- Infatuation is obsessive, whereas love is not.
- Infatuation is urgent and anxious, whereas love is calm and secure.
- Infatuation is consuming or exhausting, whereas love is energizing or healthy.
- Infatuation makes one a passive victim of its spell, whereas love entails active appreciation.

The "love versus infatuation" distinction (where only one kind or degree of love is supposedly true) has been critiqued as failing to acknowledge the full possible range of love experiences, and being largely semantic, because infatuation corresponds to passionate love (or being in love), which is regarded as a basic type of love among numerous researchers.

Another type of distinction contrasts being "in love" (as a state one endures) with love as concern for another (loving as an act).

=== Conceptual research history ===
In 1949, Albert Ellis published a research survey of young women, which found they reported differences when asked about their experience of infatuation and falling in love. For example, women reported being first infatuated at a younger median age (12) than falling in love (17), reported more adolescent infatuations than loves, and more often reported being infatuated with more than one man at a time (58%) versus being in love (25%). Infatuations were also reportedly shorter than loves, with the median girl reporting infatuation remaining for about six weeks, versus being in love for about 36 weeks (approx. 8 months). Only 3% stated their infatuations lasted more than a year, while 24% stated their loves lasted more than a year.

Ellis concludes that while it is tempting to think that infatuations may therefore be defined as being "relatively brief, light, and varietist" compared to loves, another explanation is that subjects may have consciously or unconsciously thought of their lighter and briefer loves as "infatuations", as an ego defense, while reserving "love" for longer, stronger involvements. Some evidence of this is the fact that subjects tended to identify their more recent involvements as "love" rather than "infatuation". The difference between infatuation and love might therefore be relative to how one's perception changes of past relationships as one gets older.

In 1961, Ellis later wrote than he found this use of "infatuation" among his survey respondents to be "confused" and "quite at variance" with a dictionary definition of infatuation (involving "extravagant passion")—suggesting the word actually came to lose its original meaning. Ellis believes this occurred because monogamy is so enforced through social norms (where "true" love is defined as enduring, and conflated with marriage) that individuals came to label virtually all of their past involvements as "infatuation", to avoid feelings of shame over falling in love as frequently as they did. According to Ellis, this is a conceptual error, and there is no such thing as "true" love. Instead, the experience of love encompasses innumerable differences in kind and degree, all of which are "true" as long as they are still occurring.

On the basis of this observation, that the distinction being made is seemingly semantic, the researcher Elaine Hatfield later argued that infatuation is the same as what she calls "passionate love". Passionate love is "a state of intense longing for union with another", contrasted with companionate love, "the affection we feel for those with whom our lives are deeply entwined". In contrast to infatuation, companionate love is the one sometimes labeled "true love", or compared to secure attachment.

According to Hatfield, in 1978:

The solution to the love-versus-infatuation riddle seems to be, quite simply, that there is no difference. Psychologists have become increasingly skeptical that passionate love and infatuation differ in any way—at the time one is experiencing them.

Hatfield says that "romantic love" might be used by lovers for relationships which are still in progress, and "infatuation" for those which become terminated; the distinction might therefore be only identifiable in hindsight. Furthermore, when parents or friends say somebody is "just infatuated", they are actually just expressing disapproval.

Among researchers, it became generally accepted that passionate and companionate love are the only two important types of love to distinguish, despite subsuming the differences of other, more precise taxonomies. Modern research has often used terms like "infatuation", "passionate love", "being in love" and "limerence" interchangeably, despite their other connotations. "Romantic love" might be a further synonym for this concept, but its cultural history also makes it hard to define.

A further distinction emerged in the 2000s that passionate love (or infatuation) is different from sexual desire. Later research also discovered that love feelings can actually take on a form which lacks the obsessional features of infatuation or limerence, as in the phenomenon of long-term intense romantic love which involved study participants who claimed to be "madly in love" but had been married on average for 21 years.

== Youth ==
Adolescents often make people an object of extravagant, short-lived passion or temporary love.

A study of Indian students (aged 13 to 18) found infatuation negatively impacted their learning experience for many of them, according to the following percentages of those surveyed:

Impact of infatuation on learning
| Impact | Male (%) | Female (%) |
|---|---|---|
| Past experience of distraction | 48% | 26% |
| Distracted learning | 36% | 18% |
| Lost learning interest | 52% | 48% |
| Feeling bored with attending class | 58% | 44% |
| Skipping class | 20% | 12% |
| Low academic performance | 44% | 26% |
| Experienced stress | 36% | 38% |

== Types ==
Robert Brown lists three types of infatuation (of which he says there are various):

1. In the first, as in falling in love, a blind desire overtakes the individual, from forces of their own character which the infatuated person is unaware of, overriding their better judgment or insight.
2. In the second, which is related to the first, the infatuated individual is compelled to desire or crave an object of love which they consider unworthy, and prefer not to want or love. In this case, their evaluative judgment may be sound, but the craving is unaffected.
3. In the third, the infatuated individual exhibits poor judgment and evaluation because of ignorance and recklessness.

== Other infatuations ==
=== Transference ===
In psychoanalysis, a sign that the method is taking hold is "the initial infatuation to be observed at the beginning of treatment", the beginning of transference. The patient, in Freud's words, "develops a special interest in the person of the doctor ... never tires in his home of praising the doctor and of extolling ever new qualities in him".

What occurs, "it is usually maintained ... is a sort of false love, a shadow of love". However, psychoanalyst Janet Malcolm claims that it is wrong to convince the patient "that their love is an illusion ... that it's not you she loves. Freud was off base when he wrote that. It is you. Who else could it be?"

=== Intellectual infatuation ===
For example Jung's initial "'unconditional devotion' to Freud's theories and his 'no less unconditional veneration' of Freud's person" was seen at the time by both men as a "quasi-religious infatuation"; while Freud in turn was "very attracted by Jung's personality", perhaps "saw in Jung an idealized version of himself": they were "intellectually infatuated with one another".

=== Collective infatuation ===
But there are also collective infatuations. Thus, for instance, "the recent intellectual infatuation with structuralism and post-structuralism" arguably lasted at least until "September 11 ended intellectual infatuation with postmodernism" as a whole.

== Literary depictions ==
Shakespeare's sonnets have been described by R. P. Blackmur as "a poetics for infatuation", dominated by infatuation as a theme: "its initiation, cultivation, and history, together with its peaks of triumph and devastation".

Ivan Turgenev's novella First Love is based on the trauma of Turgenev's own adolescent infatuation with a neighbor girl, who was slightly older than him—and turned out to be having an affair with his father.

== See also ==
- Biology of romantic love – Evolution and neuroscience of romantic love
- Eros (concept) – Ancient Greek word for being in love
- Idealization and devaluation – Psychological defense mechanism
- Limerence – Love madness or intense infatuation
- Love addiction – Proposed disorder of problematic passion & distress
- Lovesickness – Mental state of unfulfilled or unrequited love
- New relationship energy – State of mind during new relationship
- Obsessive love – Possessiveness and inability to accept rejection
- Passionate and companionate love – Two basic love feelings
- Platonic love – Non-sexual love
- Puppy love – Feelings of romantic love felt by young people
- Transference neurosis – Freudian concept
- Triangular theory of love – Psychological theory by Robert Sternberg
- Unrequited love – Love that is not reciprocated
