= New relationship energy =

State of mind during new relationship

New relationship energy (or NRE) is the overwhelming sense of excitement felt while falling in love when a romantic relationship is new. NRE begins with the earliest attractions, may grow into full force when mutuality is established, and can fade over months or years. The term indicates contrast to those feelings aroused in an "old" or ongoing relationship.

The term originated in the Usenet postings of Zhahai Stewart in the 1980s and was more widely presented in 1993. This concept is similar to that of limerence, but differs in that limerence can also be experienced absent a relationship.

While the dynamics described by NRE apply to all relationships, the term is particularly prevalent in the polyamorous community, as people with multiple concurrent intimate relationships experience new relationship energy alongside more settled ongoing relationships. Adjusting to and compensating for the contrast in affect and excitement between the new and old relationships is considered an important factor in successfully balancing those relationships. Describing the process in a positive way can help old partners deal with feelings of jealousy towards the new partner, as well as helping the person with a new partner be more understanding and conscious of maintaining their existing relationships.

A less-common variant is new relationship chemistry, which is conceptually similar to NRE except with emphasis explicitly limited to the brain chemistry involved in creating the euphoric feelings, rather than actions and rationalized feelings involved with NRE.

== See also ==
- Falling in love – Process of developing strong feelings of attachment and love
- Infatuation – Intense but shallow attraction
- Limerence – Love madness or intense infatuation
- Passionate and companionate love – Two basic ways to experience romantic feelings
- Puppy love – Feelings of romantic love felt by young people
- Romance – Love focused on feelings
