= John Alan Lee =

Canadian writer, academic and political activist

- Born: 24 August 1933; Maxville, Ontario, Canada
- Died: 5 December 2013 (aged 80); Toronto, Ontario
- Education: University of Toronto (B.A.), University of Sussex (Ph.D.)
- Occupations: Sociologist; activist
- Writing career
- Language: English
- Period: 1970s–2000s
- Subjects: Psychology and sociology of love and sexuality
- Notable works: The Colours of Love; Getting Sex
- Political party: Co-operative Commonwealth Federation

John Alan Lee (24 August 1933 – 5 December 2013) was a Canadian writer, academic and political activist, best known as an early advocate for LGBT rights in Canada, for his academic research into sociological and psychological aspects of love and sexuality, and for his later-life advocacy of assisted suicide and the right to die.

== Early life ==
Born in Maxville, Ontario, in 1933, he grew up as a ward of the provincial Children's Aid Society after his father abandoned the family and his mother was financially and emotionally unable to care for Lee and his brother David on her own.

He was a factory worker and trade unionist in his youth, and ran as a Co-operative Commonwealth Federation candidate in the electoral district of Broadview in the 1958 election.

== Education and academic career ==
He completed an undergraduate degree in sociology at the University of Toronto in 1956, and earned a Ph.D. from the University of Sussex in 1971. He then joined the University of Toronto as a faculty member in 1971. In the same year, his book Test Pattern: Instructional Television at Scarborough College, University of Toronto was published by the University of Toronto Press. Teaching at the university until his retirement in 1999, he was the author of over 300 articles and books in sociology, predominantly focusing on sociological study of the LGBT community and on the broader psychology of love and sexuality.

His articles appeared in publications including the Canadian Journal of Higher Education, the Journal of Homosexuality, Psychology Today, The Body Politic, Canadian Forum and Christopher Street. His most noted books were The Colours of Love (1973), the first prominent work of research into the concept of love styles, and Getting Sex (1978), a study of gay cruising.

== Activism ==
In 1964, Lee began working as an "undercover gay activist", writing letters to various publications to protest unfair and biased depictions of LGBT people and writing more balanced pieces of his own. Initially undertaking this work anonymously or under pseudonyms, in 1974 he officially came out on TVOntario's The Judy LaMarsh Show, becoming one of Canada's first professional figures ever to come out as gay.

In 1975, he was one of the founders of the University of Toronto's Gay Academic Union. In 1979, he was an organizer of an LGBT rights protest which consisted of a three-day sit-in in the offices of provincial Attorney General Roy McMurtry. Following Operation Soap in 1981, he was one of the founders of the Right to Privacy Committee.

He was also active in other organizations, including the Sierra Club, Amnesty International, and the Religious Society of Friends.

Late in life he was active in Dying with Dignity, a Canadian right to die activist group. Although in poor health, he was not terminally ill, but advocated that he should have the right to die on the grounds that his life was complete and he no longer had anything new he wanted to accomplish or achieve. During this era, he also published his autobiography, Love's Gay Fool, as a free document on his website.

He ended his life on 5 December 2013.

== Honours ==
In honour of his role as a significant builder of LGBT culture and history in Canada, a portrait of Lee, by artist Norman Hatton, is held by The ArQuives' National Portrait Collection. The ArQuives also holds many of his personal papers and records from throughout his career.

== Electoral record ==
1958 Canadian federal election: Broadview
Party	Candidate	Votes
Progressive Conservative	George Hees	15,364
Liberal	George A. Taylor	4,738
Co-operative Commonwealth	John Alan Lee	3,356
Socialist	Ross Dowson	447

== See also ==
- The Lee Report
