= Obsessive love =

Possessiveness and inability to accept rejection

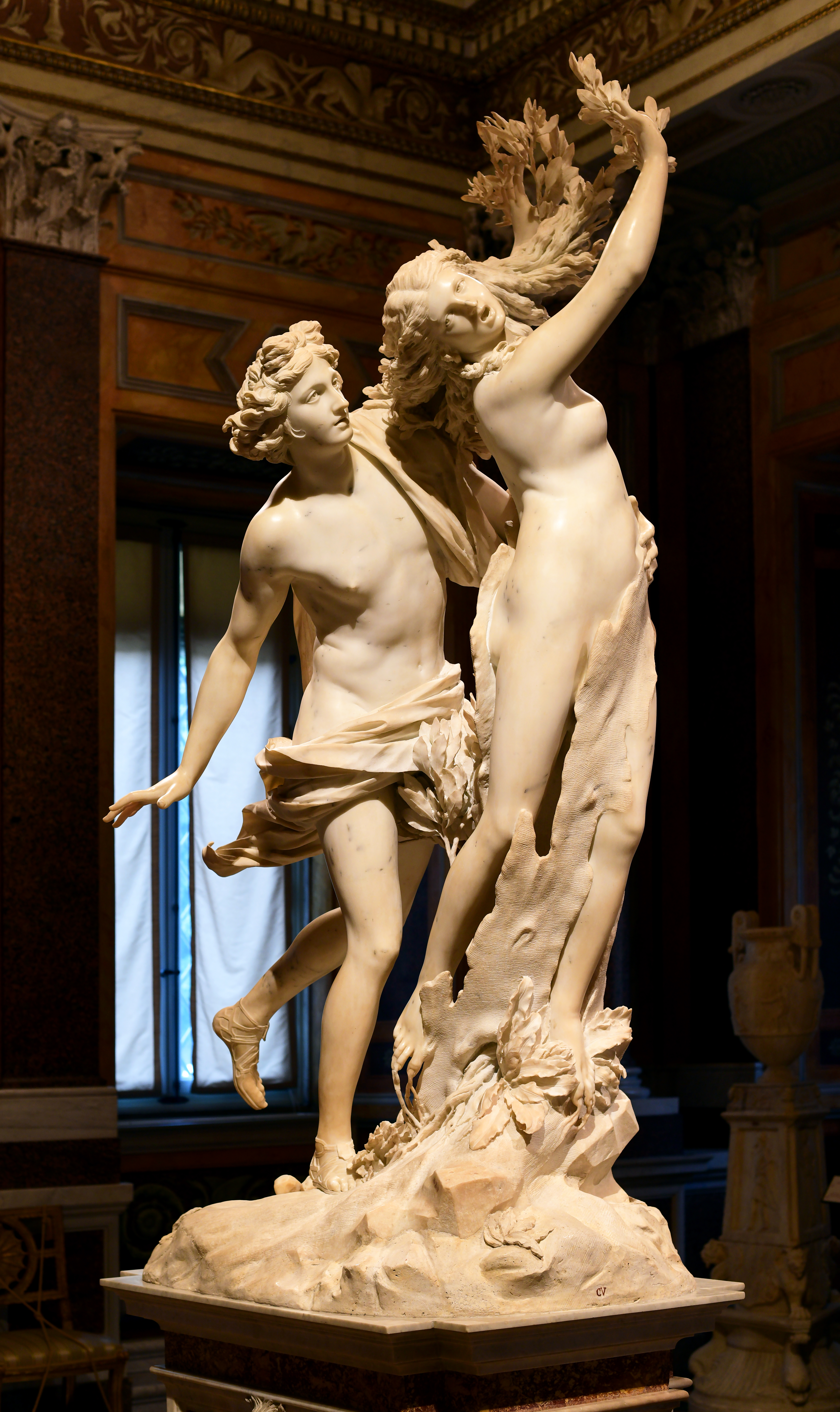
Apollo and Daphne, by Gian Lorenzo Bernini. In Greek mythology, Eros is said to have punished Apollo by firing an arrow to make him fall in love with Daphne, and another to make Daphne disgusted with him and flee. The sculpture depicts Daphne turning into a tree to escape the relentless pursuit of Apollo.

Obsessive love is characterized by obsessive or compulsive attempts to possess or control an individual, especially triggered (or even intensified) by rejection. Obsessive love can also be distinguished from other forms of romantic love by its one-sidedness and repulsed approaches. Rejection is the "ultimate nightmare" to an obsessive lover, who can not let go when confronted with disinterest or the loss of a partner.

Usually obsessive love leads to feelings of worthlessness, self-destructive behavior and social withdrawal, but in some cases an obsessive lover may monitor or stalk the object of their passion, or commit acts of violence. According to J. Reid Meloy, "Violent behavior toward self or others as the denoument of unrequited love is as old as antiquity."

Most obsessional stalkers who are not delusional had some type of a relationship with their victim (an ex-partner), and have personality disorders.

According to Robert Bringle and Robert Rydell, obsessive love is considered a normal phenomenon because the features shared with pathological obsessions (e.g. OCD, criminal stalking) are not usually extreme enough to warrant a clinical diagnosis.

== Comparison ==
The term "obsessive love" is also mentioned in reference to other concepts:

Mania love style

In the color wheel theory of love, mania is a possessive, dependent love style. A manic lover is insecure, jealous, and needs reassurances of being loved. A manic lover is unsure of who attracts them, so they may fall in love with somebody they don't even like and project unrealistic qualities onto them.

Among the other love styles, mania is most closely compared to eros, which is erotic love or love of beauty. An eros lover is also intensely preoccupied with their beloved, but they are self-assured. The eros lover is in search of an ideal; they tend to fall in love with somebody more of their preference, and in a less chaotic way.

Passionate love, romantic love, or infatuation

Passionate love is the kind of love felt in the early stage of a relationship, or for a potential partner before a relationship has occurred (which can be unrequited). Passionate love is a state of intense longing for another, which has an obsessional element characterized by intrusive thinking, uncertainty, and mood swings. Passionate love is commonly contrasted with companionate love, the gentler feelings of affection or bonding which take more time to develop.

Passionate love is a relatively broad concept which encapsulates and combines aspects of other more precise taxonomies, but while ignoring their finer distinctions (such as the distinction between eros and mania, which roughly correspond to passionate love when taken together).

Limerence

Limerence is a love madness or all-absorbing infatuated love (comparable to passionate love), commonly for an unreachable person. Limerence is said to be "a condition of cognitive obsession" where the person experiencing it spends much of their time fantasizing about their love object (called the "limerent object")—the kind of love Romeo and Juliet felt for each other. Limerence can impact day-to-day functioning and mental health.

Limerence can be experienced for a person who is hardly known or even disliked. Usually the feeling is unrequited (resulting in a lovesickness which can be hard to end), but limerence can also be reciprocated. In cases of mutual limerence (as in Romeo and Juliet), according to Dorothy Tennov's original theory, there must be obstacles to the relationship for the mutual preoccupation to intensify. According to Tennov, the inventor of the term, limerence is supposed to be viewed as a normal state, and tragedies (e.g. violence or suicide) only seem to happen when limerence is "augmented and distorted" by other conditions.

Lovesickness

Lovesickness is the mental state brought on by unfulfilled, unconsummated, or unrequited love.

Love addiction

Love addiction is a proposed disorder involving love relations characterized by severe distress and problematic passion-seeking despite adverse consequences. Academics do not currently agree on when love is an addiction, or when it needs to be treated.

Erotomania

Erotomania is a delusional disorder where the sufferer has a delusional belief that their love is reciprocated when it isn't (also called "de Clérambault's syndrome"). A subject with erotomania will invent reasons to explain or excuse rejections, however extreme, so they continue believing their love is (secretly) reciprocated.

A related condition has been termed "morbid infatuation", where the sufferer does not believe their love is reciprocated, but still believes with a delusional intensity in the legitimacy and eventual success of their attempts to pursue a relationship (despite repeated rejections). Both kinds of delusions are common among stalkers who did not have any relationship with their target. A classification problem exists where morbid infatuations do not fall under a DSM erotomania diagnosis, because the DSM diagnosis was designed with features of de Clérambault's syndrome in mind. Historically, the term "erotomania" also did not have a precise definition.

Obsessive love disorder

"Obsessive love disorder" is an unofficial diagnosis commonly found online, but not in the DSM.

== Psychology ==
The problem with obsessive love is not so much a question of loving too intensely, but rather of anger over rejection, or feelings of abandonment. Susan Forward states that in her practice, she found four conditions which helped clarify when somebody is suffering from obsessive love:

1. They must have a painful, all-consuming preoccupation with a real or wished-for lover.
2. They must have an insatiable longing either to possess or to be possessed by the target of their obsession.
3. Their target must have rejected them or be unavailable in some way, either physically or emotionally.
4. Their target's unavailability or rejection must drive them to behave in self-defeating ways.
— Susan Forward, Obsessive Love: When It Hurts Too Much to Let Go

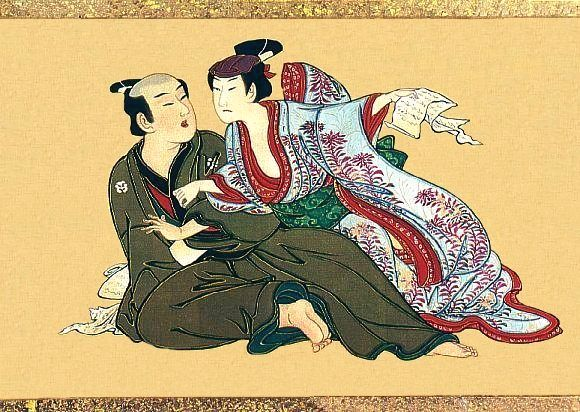
A painting by Miyagawa Isshō shows a young onnagata catching his older lover with a love letter from a rival, c. 1750.

John Moore describes the process of those who "confuse love with obsession" as a cycle of four phases he calls the "Obsessive Relational Progression":

1. Attraction, characterized by an initial overwhelming attraction to a new person, unrealistic fantasies, an immediate urge to rush into a relationship, and the start of controlling behaviors.
2. Anxiety, a turning point which usually occurs after a commitment has been made, where unfounded thoughts of infidelity, betrayal and fear of abandonment occur, resulting in mistrust, depression, anxiety, and the escalation of controlling behaviors.
3. Obsession, when extreme behaviors begin to overwhelm, resulting in obsessive surveillance, stalking, and possibly violence.
4. Destruction, where the partner flees the relationship.

Obsessive love may be related to the anxious attachment style. The mania love attitude (for obsessive, dependent love) has been correlated with attachment anxiety, and also the personality trait neuroticism.

The anthropologist Helen Fisher believed that "abandonment rage" (anger after a rejection) can be explained in terms of the frustration–aggression hypothesis, where rage is triggered when an expected reward is in jeopardy. Romantic love and rage are connected in the brain by similar circuitry; both involve arousal and energy production, and both drive obsessive focus and goal-directed behaviors. Fisher believed that ordinarily the evolutionary purpose of abandonment rage is to facilitate separation and the search for a new partner, although sometimes abandonment rage erupts into violence instead.

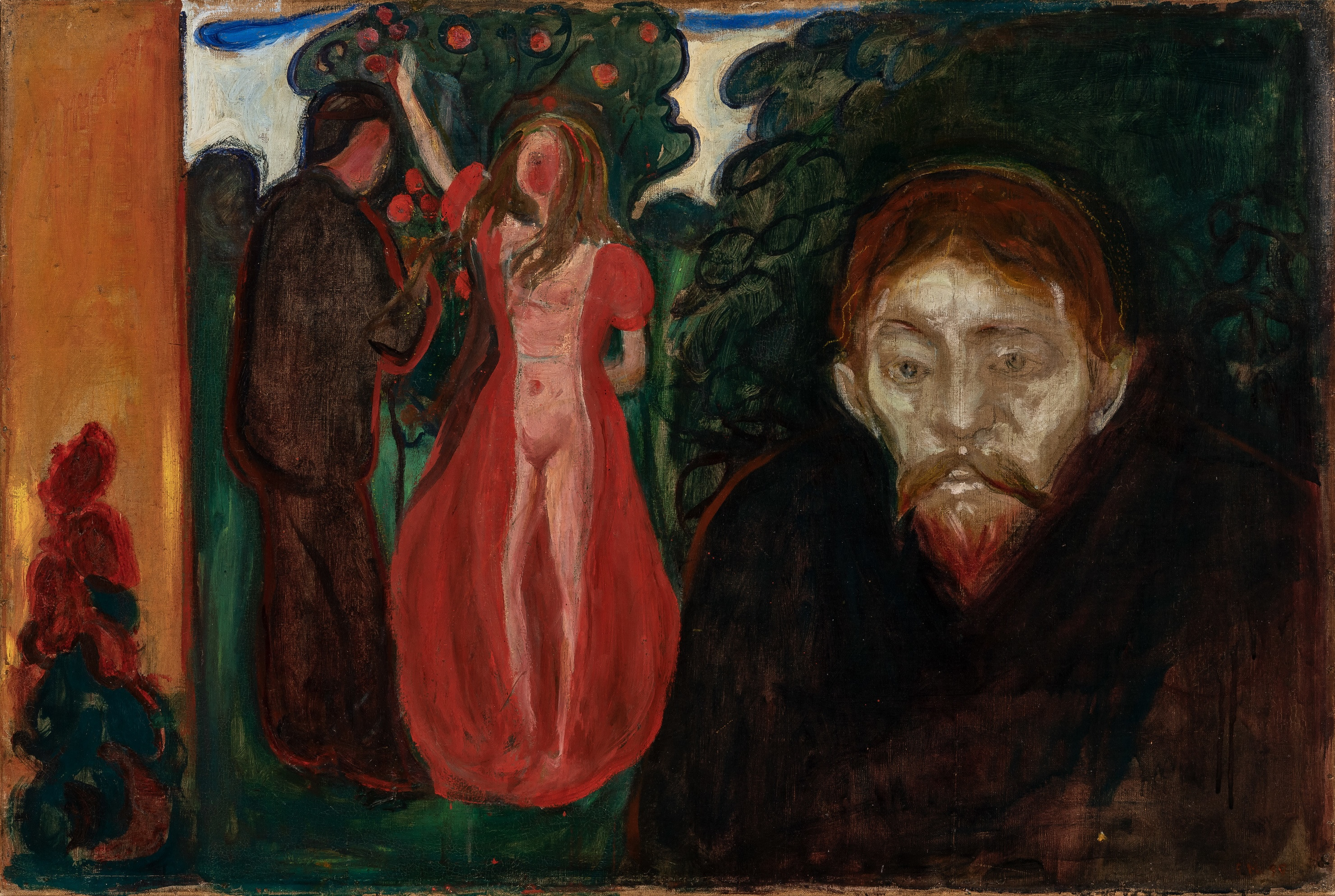
Jealousy (1895), by Edvard Munch

Another feature of obsessive love is jealousy, which seems to be related to OCD for its obsessional qualities and compulsive checking (for signs of infidelity). This can also take the form of pathological jealousy (or "Othello syndrome") where the sufferer has a delusional or paranoid belief in their partner's infidelity, despite actual evidence. Jealousy is strongly associated with irritability, which can erupt into violence: spousal murder is often related to infidelity (real or suspected). It has been suggested that this seemingly self-defeating behavior of murdering one's own partner results from a kind of "brinkmanship", where a looming threat of violence is used to control women as sexual partners—a threat which sometimes (paradoxically) escalates into actual violence to be "credible".

It is argued that non-pathological jealousy evolved as protection against reproductive competition, which is adaptive as long as it serves to maintain a relationship.

=== Obsessive and harmonious passion ===
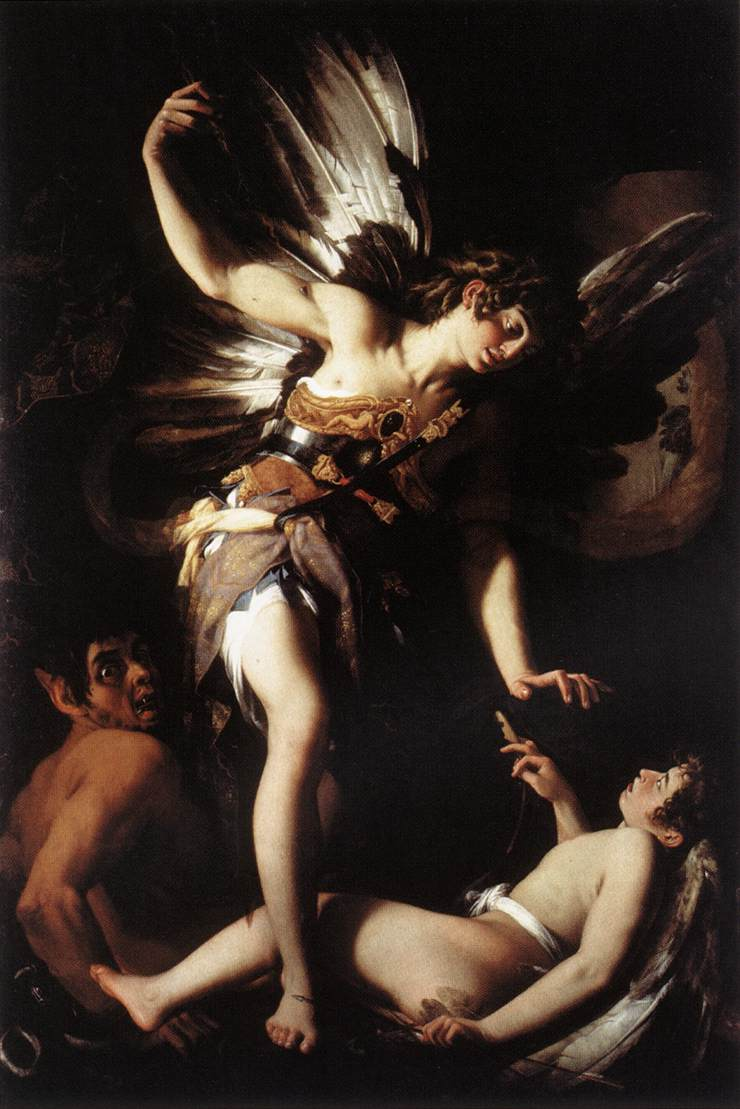
Divine Love Conquering Earthly Love, by Giovanni Baglione.

The dualistic model of passion (DMP) is a theory invented by the psychologist Robert Vallerand which suggests that passion can be split into two components, termed "obsessive" and "harmonious" passion:

DMP has been extended to romantic passion, with a study finding that harmonious romantic passion was associated with secure attachment, while obsessive romantic passion was associated with anxious attachment. One issue addressed by the model is the idea that passion is either positive or negative based on whether it's reciprocated or not (as in Elaine Hatfield's conception of passionate love), because this ignores the possibility of negative outcomes occurring inside a relationship. Negative relationship outcomes are proposed to be mainly associated with obsessive passion.

The obsessive–harmonious distinction has also been compared to the distinction between two of the love styles invented by John Alan Lee: mania (obsessive) and eros (harmonious). Both eros and mania correspond to concepts like romantic love, passionate love, and falling in love; however, mania is regarded as the more obsessive of the two.

"Limerence" is a term invented by the psychologist Dorothy Tennov to refer to the state of being in love, particularly when it takes the form of obsessive passion. Limerence and mania have been compared as being similar concepts, identified and developed by their respective authors around the same time.

Research on the Passionate Love Scale (PLS) by Bianca Acevedo and Arthur Aron also found that while it was intended as a unidimensional measure of love feelings, it actually has two general components (called factors): an obsession factor and a non-obsession factor. The PLS obsession factor has items like "Sometimes I feel I can't control my thoughts; they are obsessively on my partner." and "An existence without my partner would be dark and dismal." The non-obsession factor has items like "For me, my partner is the perfect romantic partner." and "I want my partner—physically, emotionally, and mentally."

Acevedo & Aron also compare being in love with obsessional elements to concepts like mania and limerence, while love without obsession is compared to eros. Taken together, eros and mania correspond to the way passionate love is operationalized on the PLS.

According to a meta-analysis by Acevedo & Aron, romantic love with and without obsession (using the PLS) have slightly different trajectories in a relationship. Romantic love with obsession was more associated with satisfaction in short-term relationships than long-term, whereas the associations between satisfaction and romantic love without obsession were similar and large for both short-term and long-term groups. Additionally, it was found that romantic love may sustain over a longer period than previously assumed, but without the obsessional features. Another meta-analysis found that the mania love attitude was associated with decreased satisfaction, as it continues over time in a relationship.

== Stalking ==
Let's say I committed this crime. Even if I did do this, it would have to have been because I loved her very much, right?

— O. J. Simpson

Love obsessionality can in some cases lead to stalking, although stalkers also often have other conditions. Like falling in love, stalking is also described as a form of addiction. A 1999 study by Paul Mullen and colleagues classified 145 stalkers according to several kinds of groups:

- Rejected ex-partners (41 of 145), who mostly had personality disorders, although 9 were delusional, 5 of whom had morbid jealousy. Rejected stalkers often had mixed desire for reconciliation and revenge, as well as frustration, anger, jealousy, vindictiveness, and sadness.
- Intimacy seekers (49 of 145), who were attempting to establish an intimate relationship with their "true love", most of whom were delusional, and further classified as follows:
  - Those with erotomania (27 of 145), with a delusional belief their love was reciprocated.
  - Those with morbid infatuations (15 of 145), who did not believe their love was reciprocated but still believed a delusion of their eventual success.
  - Those who had personality disorders (7 of 145), but were not delusional.
- Incompetent stalkers (22 of 145), who regarded their victims as attractive potential partners, but who were intellectually limited and socially incompetent instead of being infatuated.
- The other 33 stalkers identified by the study had motives other than a relationship (e.g. broken friendships/family, sexual predation, or scaring a victim).

Limerence is another type of love obsession which is being compared to the others, but the motives and emotional foundations behind limerence are different from stalking. A person in limerence hopes for mutual feelings, and their mood depends on whether their romantic interest seems to be returned, whereas the motive for stalking is to force contact, control or punish a victim for rejection. Limerence can cause distress if it becomes too intense, but it's also a feature of early-stage romantic love for many people.

A preoccupation with the fantasy of a special and unique relationship with the object of one's love is normal in the early part of romance or infatuation; however, in the case of the stalker, where pathological narcissism is an issue, the humiliation of rejection is expressed through rage or entitlement and pursuit of the victim.

== Neuroscience ==
=== Obsession ===

Obsessive thinking about a loved one has been called a hallmark or a cardinal trait of romantic love, ensuring that the loved one is not forgotten. Some reports have been made that people can even spend as much as 85 to 100% of their days and nights thinking about a love object. One study found that on average people in love spent 65% of their waking hours thinking about their beloved. Another study used cluster analysis to find several different groups of lovers, with the least intense group spending 35% of their time on average and the most intense at 72%. Since the late 1990s, these obsessional features have been compared to obsessive–compulsive disorder (OCD). This is also sometimes paired with a theory that obsessive (or intrusive) thinking is related to serotonin levels being lowered while in love, although study results have been inconsistent or negative. Another theory relates obsessive thinking to addiction, because drug users exhibit obsessive thoughts about drug use as well as compulsions.

=== Addiction ===
The early stage of romantic love is being compared to a behavioral addiction (i.e., addiction to a non-substance) but the "substance" involved is the loved person. Addiction involves a phenomenon known as incentive salience, also called "wanting" (in quotes). This is the property by which cues in the environment stand out to a person and become attention-grabbing and attractive, like a "motivational magnet" which pulls a person towards a particular reward. Incentive salience differs from craving in that craving is a conscious experience while incentive salience may or may not be. While incentive salience can give feelings of strong urgency to cravings, it can also motivate behavior unconsciously, as in an experiment where cocaine users were unaware of their own decisions to choose a low dose of cocaine (which they believed was placebo) more often than an actual placebo. In the incentive-sensitization theory of addiction, repeated drug use renders the brain hypersensitive to drugs and drug cues, resulting in pathological levels of "wanting" to use drugs. People in love are thought to experience incentive salience in response to their beloved. Lovers share other similarities with addicts as well, like tolerance, dependence, withdrawal, relapse, craving, and mood modification.

== Cultural references ==
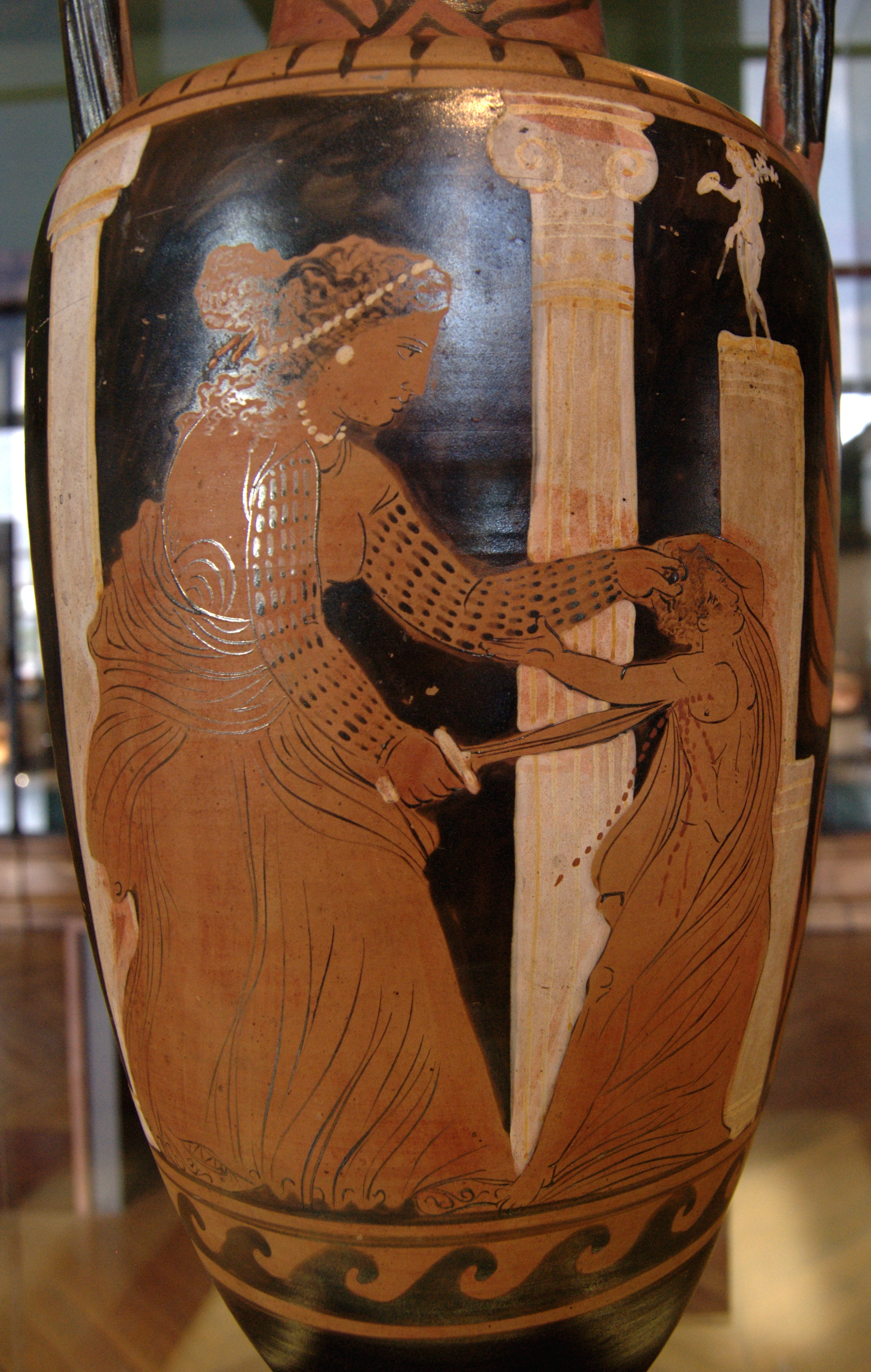
Medea murdering one of her children

The ancient Greeks called obsessive love "theia mania" (the madness from the gods). Greek mythology depicted it in stories such as Apollo and Daphne. In ancient literature, a frustrated lover was frequently depicted as violent and manic, involving murder or suicide. Such an example is Medea, whose obsessive love for Jason escalates to murder. By contrast, the depiction of lovesickness in the form of a depressed, melancholic lover is more of a cliché of medieval and modern literature, although it was present in ancient literature as well, and described by early physicians.

Obsessive love has been depicted in the movies Play Misty for Me, Fatal Attraction, Vanilla Sky, Jodi Arias: Dirty Little Secret, and Obsession, the television series You, and the novels Wuthering Heights and The Phantom of the Opera. The history of obsessive love in the cinema is explored at length by Dominique Mainon and James Ursini in their book Cinema of Obsession.

== See also ==
- Anxious-preoccupied attachment – Interpersonal attachment style
- Broken heart – Intense stress or pain one feels at experiencing longing
- Control freak – Colloquialism for a person obsessed with control
- Controlling behavior in relationships – Aspect of personal relationships
- Domestic violence – Abuse of members of the same household
- Erotomania – Romantic delusional disorder
- Fatal attraction (sociology) – When qualities leading to attraction lead to breakup
- Limerence – Love madness or intense infatuation
- Lovesickness – Mental state of unfulfilled or unrequited love
- Love addiction – Proposed disorder of problematic passion & distress
- Pathological jealousy – Psychological disorder
- Relationship obsessive–compulsive disorder
- Romantic love (mental state) – Mental state of being in love
- Stalking – Unwanted observation
- Unrequited love – Love that is not reciprocated
- Yandere – Character archetype in anime and manga

== Bibliography ==
- Belton, Monique; Bailey, Eileen (2011-06-07). The Essential Guide to Overcoming Obsessive Love. Penguin. ISBN 978-1-101-51580-8.
- Cupach, William R.; Spitzberg, Brian H. (1998). "Obsessive Relational Intrusion and Stalking". In Spitzberg, Brian H.; Cupach, William R. (eds.). The Dark Side of Close Relationships. Lawrence Erlbaum Associates. pp. 233–263. ISBN 0-8058-2487-1.
- Fisher, Helen (2004). Why We Love: The Nature and Chemistry of Romantic Love. Henry Holt and Company. ISBN 978-0-8050-7796-4. Archived from the original on 23 May 2024.
- Fisher, Helen (2016). Anatomy of Love: A Natural History of Mating, Marriage, and Why We Stray (Completely Revised and Updated). W. W. Norton & Company. ISBN 978-0-393-34974-0. Archived from the original on 18 February 2024.
- Forward, Susan; Buck, Craig (2002-01-02). Obsessive Love: When It Hurts Too Much to Let Go. Random House Publishing Group. ISBN 978-0-553-38142-9.
- Hatfield, Elaine; Walster, G. William (1985). A New Look at Love. University Press of America. ISBN 9780819149572.
- Hendrick, Clyde; Hendrick, Susan S. (2006). "Styles of Romantic Love". In Sternberg, Robert; Weis, Karin (eds.). The New Psychology of Love. Yale University Press. pp. 149–170. ISBN 9780300116977.
- Lee, John Alan (1973). Colours of Love: An Exploration of the Ways of Loving. New Press. ISBN 978-0-88770-187-0.
- Lee, John (1977). The Colors of Love. Bantam Books. ISBN 0-553-10520-5.
- Lee, John (1988). "Love-Styles". In Sternberg, Robert (ed.). The Psychology of Love. Yale University Press. pp. 38–67. ISBN 0-300-03950-6.
- Lee, John (1998). "Ideologies of Lovestyle and Sexstyle". In De Munck, Victor C. (ed.). Romantic Love and Sexual Behavior: Perspectives from the Social Sciences. Greenwood Publishing Group. pp. 33–76. ISBN 978-0-275-95726-1.
- Mainon, Dominique; Ursini, James (October 2007). Cinema of Obsession: Erotic Fixation and Love Gone Wrong in the Movies. Hal Leonard Corporation. ISBN 978-0-87910-347-7.
- Millman, Marcia (2002-02-05). The Seven Stories of Love: How to Recognize Your Own Pattern of Love--and Choose Your Happy Ending. HarperCollins. ISBN 978-0-06-000786-7.
- Money, John (1997). Principles of Developmental Sexology. New York: Continuum. ISBN 978-0-8264-1026-9.
- Moore, John D. (2010-08-04). Confusing Love With Obsession: When Being in Love Means Being in Control. Simon and Schuster. ISBN 978-1-59285-964-1.
- Mullen, Paul E.; Pathé, Michele; Purcell, Rosemary (2008-11-13). Stalkers and their Victims. Cambridge University Press. ISBN 978-1-107-37639-7.
- Tallis, Frank (January 2005). Love Sick: Love as a Mental Illness. Thunder's Mouth Press. ISBN 978-1-56025-647-2.
- Tennov, Dorothy (1999). Love and Limerence: The Experience of Being in Love. Scarborough House. ISBN 978-0-8128-6286-7. Archived from the original on 27 March 2023.
- Tennov, Dorothy (1998). "Love Madness". In De Munck, Victor C. (ed.). Romantic Love and Sexual Behavior: Perspectives from the Social Sciences. Greenwood Publishing Group. pp. 77–88. ISBN 978-0-275-95726-1.
