= Relationship obsessive–compulsive disorder =

In psychology, relationship obsessive–compulsive disorder (ROCD) is a form of obsessive–compulsive disorder focusing on close intimate relationships. Such obsessions can become extremely distressing and debilitating, having negative impacts on relationships functioning.

Obsessive–compulsive disorder comprises thoughts, images or urges that are unwanted, distressing, interfere with a person's life and that are commonly experienced as contradicting a person's beliefs and values. In the fifth and most recent version of the Diagnostic and Statistical Manual (DSM-5) the criteria for obsessive-compulsive disorder is characterized as of obsessions, compulsions, or both. Obsessions are unwanted chronic distressing thoughts, sometimes called intrusive thoughts. Such intrusive thoughts are frequently followed by compulsive behaviors aimed at "neutralizing" the feared consequence of the intrusions and temporarily relieve the anxiety caused by the obsessions. Attempts to suppress or "neutralize" obsessions increase rather than decrease the frequency and distress caused by the obsessions.

While not specifically defined in the DSM-5, subtypes of OCD exist surrounding different obsessive themes. Common obsessive themes include fear of contamination or of losing control; aggressive thoughts; or a desire for symmetry. People with obsessive-compulsive disorder may also have obsessive themes surrounding religious or sexual taboos. Some people may also experience obsessions relating to close interpersonal relationships, either current or past, a subtype referred to as relationship obsessive-compulsive disorder (ROCD). Relationship OCD often refers to a person's obsessions regarding a romantic relationship or romantic partner but is not limited to this; symptoms can manifest in different non-romantic contexts such as parent-child relationships. As with other OCD themes, ROCD preoccupations are unwanted, intrusive, chronic and disabling.

General OCD, absent of specific relationship-related obsessions, can also affect a person's interpersonal relationships, especially intimate romantic relationships. Women with OCD have been shown to have decreased sexual function and satisfaction compared to women with generalized anxiety disorder. OCD symptoms have been shown to affect sexual functioning in both men and women. OCD symptoms have even been shown to have a moderate negative correlation with different forms of intimacy, though the relationship between the two is complicated. Obsessive washing themes has been shown to be positively correlated with fear of contamination during sex and also sexual desire. Additionally, certain compulsive behaviors such as washing and neutralizing have been shown to be positively correlated with various relationship factors. Even when symptoms do not necessarily follow relationship themes, OCD still affects a person's ability to form and maintain relationships.

== Signs and symptoms ==
Relationship OCD symptoms, especially in romantic relationships, generally present as relationship-centered or partner-focused symptoms. Though these presentations are different they are not mutually exclusive as they tend to co-occur and even compound each other.

=== Relationship-centered symptoms ===
Relationship-centered symptoms refer to thoughts that revolve around the "rightness" of the relationship, including doubts about one's own feelings or the sincerity of one's partner's feelings. People may continuously doubt whether they love their partner, whether their relationship is the "right" relationship, or whether their partner really loves them. Often, patients know these doubts are irrational and will seek reassurance either from themselves or their partner. This can cause distress whether the person chooses to remain in the relationship or leave it.

=== Partner-focused symptoms ===
Partner-focused symptoms refer to obsessions regarding a partner's perceived flaws. These perceived deficits can be related to many factors including appearance, sociability, intelligence or morality. Partner-focused symptoms can also manifest in parent child relationships, where the parent obsesses over the child's perceived flaws.

Both types of symptoms can manifest as intrusive thoughts, images, and/or urges related to the relationship. There is often a great deal of distress associated with these symptoms, as they tend to contradict one's personal values and the subjective experience of the relationship. The individual views these symptoms as unacceptable and unwanted, invoking feelings of guilt and shame. People suffering with ROCD often perform compulsions to deal with the significant distress. Compulsions may include constant reassurance seeking, being hyperaware of one's feelings, comparing their partners to other potential partners, and trying to visualize being happy with their partner.

Recent research suggests that partner-focused symptoms in a parent-child context can cause significant parental stress, and depression. Additionally, it can promote anxiety, depression, and OCD symptoms in the child.

== Causes ==
Like other forms of OCD, psychological and biological factors are believed to play a role in the development and maintenance of ROCD. In addition to the maladaptive ways of thinking and behaving identified as important in OCD, models of ROCD suggest that over-reliance on intimate relationships or the perceived value of the partner for a person's feelings of self-worth and fear of abandonment (also see attachment theory) may increase vulnerability and maintain ROCD symptoms.

== Cognitive-Behavioral Model of OCD ==
ROCD is a form of OCD. Cognitive behavioral therapies (CBT) are considered the Gold Standard psychological treatments for OCD. According to the cognitive-behavioral model, unwanted, intrusive thoughts, images and urges are not, in themselves, abnormal. Individuals with OCD, however, interpret these intrusive experiences as indicating something wrong with their character or as premonitions of future catastrophe. For instance, they may interpret the mere occurrence of an unwanted thought regarding a loved one having an accident as meaning that they wanted something bad to happen to the loved one. Such interpretations increase attention to unwanted intrusive experiences, making them more distressing and increasing their frequency. Individuals with OCD try to control, neutralize or prevent intrusive thoughts from occurring using washing, checking, avoidance, suppression of thoughts or other mental and behavioral rituals (compulsions). These control attempts, paradoxically increase (rather than decrease) the occurrence of these unwanted intrusions and the distress associated with them. According to CBT models, individuals with OCD give such extremely negative interpretations to intrusive experiences because they hold maladaptive beliefs. For instance, the belief that if anything bad happens it is their own responsibility (inflated responsibility), can lead individuals with OCD to wash their hands repeatedly after having the thought "this may be contaminated." They will do this, in order to avoid feeling responsible for hurting someone else or themselves.

In ROCD, intrusions relating to the "rightness" of relationship or the suitability of the relationship partner (e.g., not smart, moral or good looking enough) are often the most distressing. In order to reduce the distress associated with such intrusions, individuals with ROCD often use various mental or behavioral strategies. For instance, they often try to get reassurance from others that the partner or the relationship is good enough; they may test the partner or check (from up close) their perceived flaw; they may look for information on the internet on "how do I know I'm in the right relationship"; or assess their physical reaction and feelings towards their partner. These and similar behaviors increase the attention given to the intrusions, giving them a sense of increased importance, and increase their frequency. Individuals with ROCD also give catastrophic meaning to intrusions based on extreme maladaptive beliefs such as being in a relationship they are not absolutely sure about always leads to extreme disaster. Such beliefs lead individuals with ROCD to interpret common relationship doubts in a catastrophic way, provoking compulsive mental acts and behaviors such as repeated checking of perceived flaws or repeated assessment of the strength and quality of one's feelings towards the partner.

== Treatment ==
=== First-line Treatments ===
Several treatment options exists for OCD (including ROCD). First-line treatments includes psychotherapy such as cognitive behavioral therapy (CBT), and drugs such as SSRIs.

CBT with exposure and response prevention treats OCD by exposing the patient to feared thoughts or images and challenging maladaptive relationship beliefs (e.g., believing that being in love means being happy all the time) and more common OCD beliefs such as perfectionism and intolerance of uncertainty. This treatment includes exposing patients to stimuli that are often avoided due to fear coupled with preventing them from engaging in fear-neutralizing rituals. If other people are involved in obsessions and compulsions, as often seen in ROCD, they also may be part of the treatment to uncouple the obsession and compulsion, as well as decrease overall OCD behaviors. Additionally, working on social skills for relationships, such as conflict resolution and communication may be effective in reducing ROCD symptoms.

Psychotherapy is a highly effective, evidence-based treatment for OCD. A recent meta-analysis found 42-52% of patients experience symptom remission after psychotherapy including exposure and response prevention. Psychotherapy is also associated with fewer side effects compared to pharmacological treatments like SSRIs.

SSRIs treat OCD symptoms by disrupting the action of serotonergic transporters. Though SSRIs are also used to treat depression, higher doses tend to be more effective in patients with OCD. However, evidence supporting SSRI use as a treatment for OCD is mixed, and SSRIs tend to be less effective than psychotherapy in treating OCD symptoms. Use of SSRIs as a treatment for OCD, especially in high doses, requires additional monitoring and is associated with side effects.

=== Second-line Treatments ===
Second-line treatments include other pharmacological interventions including both Clomipramine and SNRIs. Second-line treatments are generally used when first-line treatments fail to alleviate OCD symptoms. Though Clomipramine is gaining popularity as an OCD treatment, there is little evidence to support the assertion that it is more effective that SSRIs. Similarly SNRIs have not been shown to be more effective than SSRIs. Additional pharmacological exists such as antidopaminergic agents but are less commonly used.

=== Deep Brain Stimulation as an Option for Treatment-resistant OCD and ROCD ===
Treatment-resistant OCD is categorized as patients with a less than 25% reduction in their symptoms after 12 weeks of SSRI treatment. Deep brain stimulation (DBS) is a last-line option for treatment resistant OCD. DBS is also a treatment for Parkinson's disease and involves using electrical signals to stimulate target brain areas. Lots of research has been done to investigate the efficacy and safety of DBS and has been found to be both safe and effective with minimal mild risks.

One major concern with traditional treatment options for OCD, including second and last-line treatments, is the lack of accessibility.

== See also ==
- Anxious-preoccupied attachment – Interpersonal attachment style
- Broken heart – Intense stress or pain one feels at experiencing longing
- Limerence – Love madness or intense infatuation
- Love addiction – Proposed disorder of problematic passion & distress
- Lovesickness – Mental state of unfulfilled or unrequited love
- Obsessive love – Possessiveness and inability to accept rejection
- Sexual obsessions – Persistent thoughts about sexual activity
