= Lovesickness =

Mental state of unfulfilled or unrequited love

Lovesickness is the mental state brought on by the personal experience of unfulfilled, unconsummated, or unrequited love.

Lovesickness is a feature of infatuated love or limerence (being irrationally love stricken or smitten), and included under broad labels of romantic love and passionate love. Erotomania has also been included under the heading of lovesickness. A further related term is "obsessive love".

This state of longing for an unavailable beloved is characterized by addictive cravings, depression and intrusive thoughts about a love object. Research on the biology of romantic love indicates that romantic love resembles addiction in the intense early stage (or when unreciprocated), but academics do not currently agree on how love addiction is defined. Lovesickness is not mentioned in modern medical texts, although historically it was considered a medical entity.

Lovesickness is widespread among adolescents: reportedly 33–53% had experienced problems with it, or even as many as 82%, in different studies.

== Symptoms ==
Although lovesickness is no longer recognized as a medical condition, its symptoms nevertheless bear a resemblance to other modern diagnostic entities. According to the clinical psychologist Frank Tallis, lovesickness "still looks like, feels like, and behaves like a mental illness" and "Clearly, a 'clinically significant' amount of distress and general impairment are an almost inevitable consequence of falling in love."

The four "core symptoms" of falling in love according to Tallis are as follows:

- preoccupation with the loved one and obsessive thinking, resembling obsessive–compulsive disorder.
- episodes of melancholy, resembling depression.
- episodes of rapture, resembling mania and hypomania.
- mood instability, resembling manic depression (or bipolar disorder).

Other symptoms related by Tallis with less diagnostic overlap are:

- physical symptoms resembling panic attacks (pounding heart, trembling, shortness of breath, and feeling lightheaded).
- excessive worrying, resembling generalized anxiety disorder.
- appetite disturbance and sensitivity to one's appearance, resembling anorexia nervosa.
- a feeling that life has become a dream, resembling depersonalization and derealization.

Insomnia is another consistent symptom. A scientific study found that lovesick adolescents (defined as ages 16 to 21) had lower sleep quality, and lovesickness was related to a higher frequency of nightmares with more daytime effects. According to Tallis, insomnia and restlessness seem to be primarily caused by obsession, argued to be the most fundamental of the many and varied symptoms of love.

Because no appropriate diagnosis exists, lovesickness is subject to misdiagnosis, as depression, for example. Tallis has asked whether the condition should be taken more seriously by professionals. According to Tallis, a typical clinician will not receive referrals for lovesickness, despite the intensity of potential consequences. Lovesickness may be the underlying cause of many problems being reported, so proper examination is important. One possible consequence would be suicide of the lovesick individual—hence why it was considered a potentially fatal illness by ancient physicians.

The nature of lovesickness as an illness or pathology is now being compared to addiction by modern authors. Lovesickness has been included under discussion of "love addiction", the proposed diagnosis for love relations involving severe distress or adverse consequences. However, a difficulty exists around defining such a disorder, because love passion normally involves some amount of addictive features. A further concern is the risk of misunderstanding and "overmedicalizing" or stigmatizing such individuals.

== History ==
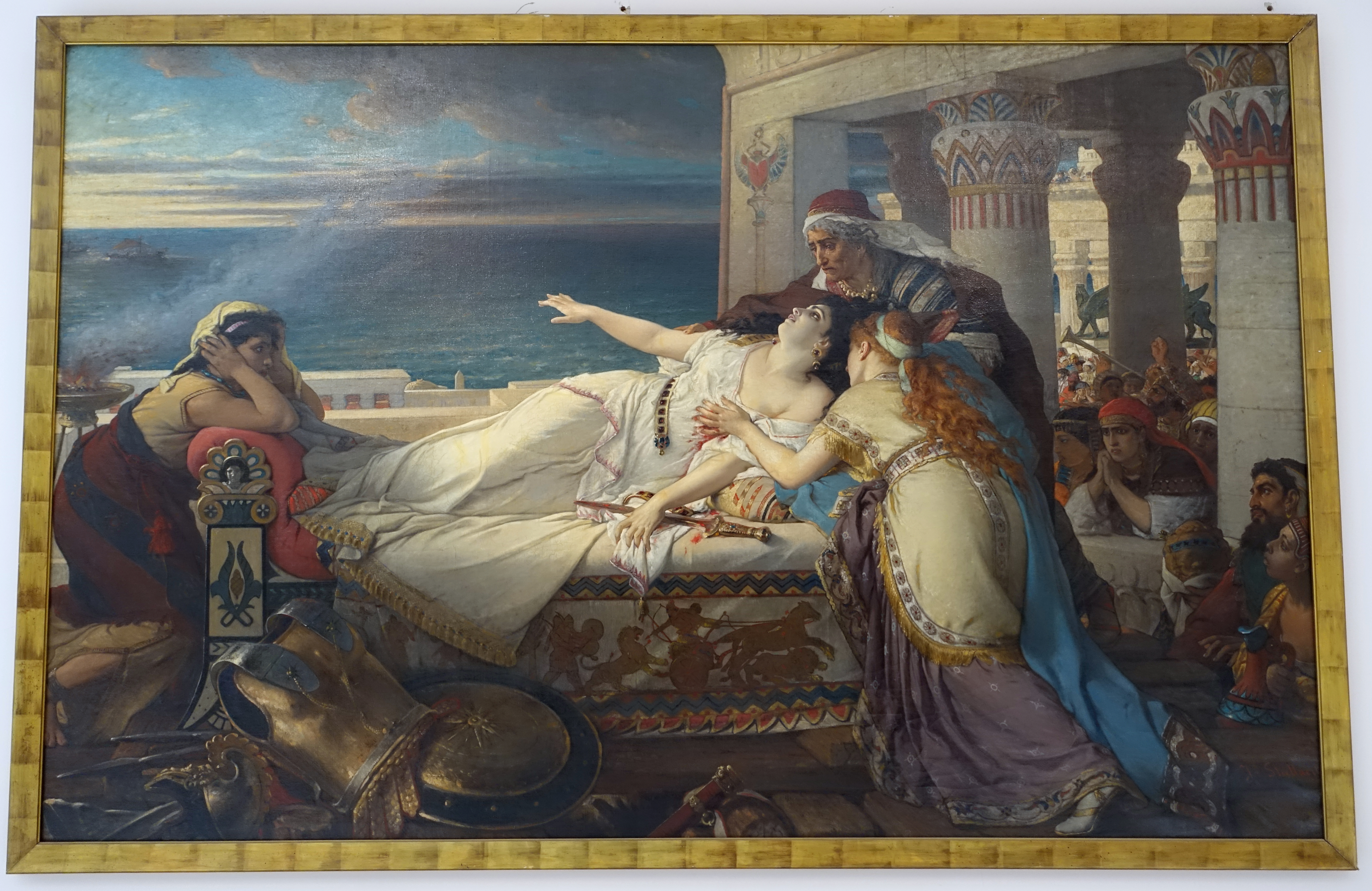
The Death of Dido by Joseph Stallaert, c. 1872, oil on canvas - Cinquantenaire Museum - Brussels, Belgium

Love has been described as an illness for as long as it has been written about—as a subject of poetry, but also a comparison the medical profession accepted for over a thousand years. Lovesickness was considered a legitimate diagnosis among doctors from the time of Galen, until around the 18th and 19th centuries.

Galen was a doctor of Greek origin, associated with ancient Rome, during a time when lovesickness began to receive the attention of doctors. Galen was a follower of the Hippocratic system of medicine (humorism), and proposed that the symptoms of lovesickness were attributable to the influence of strong passion, rather than divine intervention. Hippocratic writings had also challenged the view that other mental ailments such as epilepsy had supernatural causes.

"Love melancholia" is an almost inevitable result of passionate love according to Hippocratic principles. Physicians of ancient Greece and Rome whose writings survive interpret lovesickness as a depressive illness, characterized by sadness, insomnia, despondency, dejection, physical debility, and blinking. A similarity to depressive melancholia is discussed among these authors; however, rather than having a physical cause like melancholia, lovesickness was viewed as either a kind of psychological disturbance best cured by intercourse, or as an illness, but not caused by an excess of black bile.

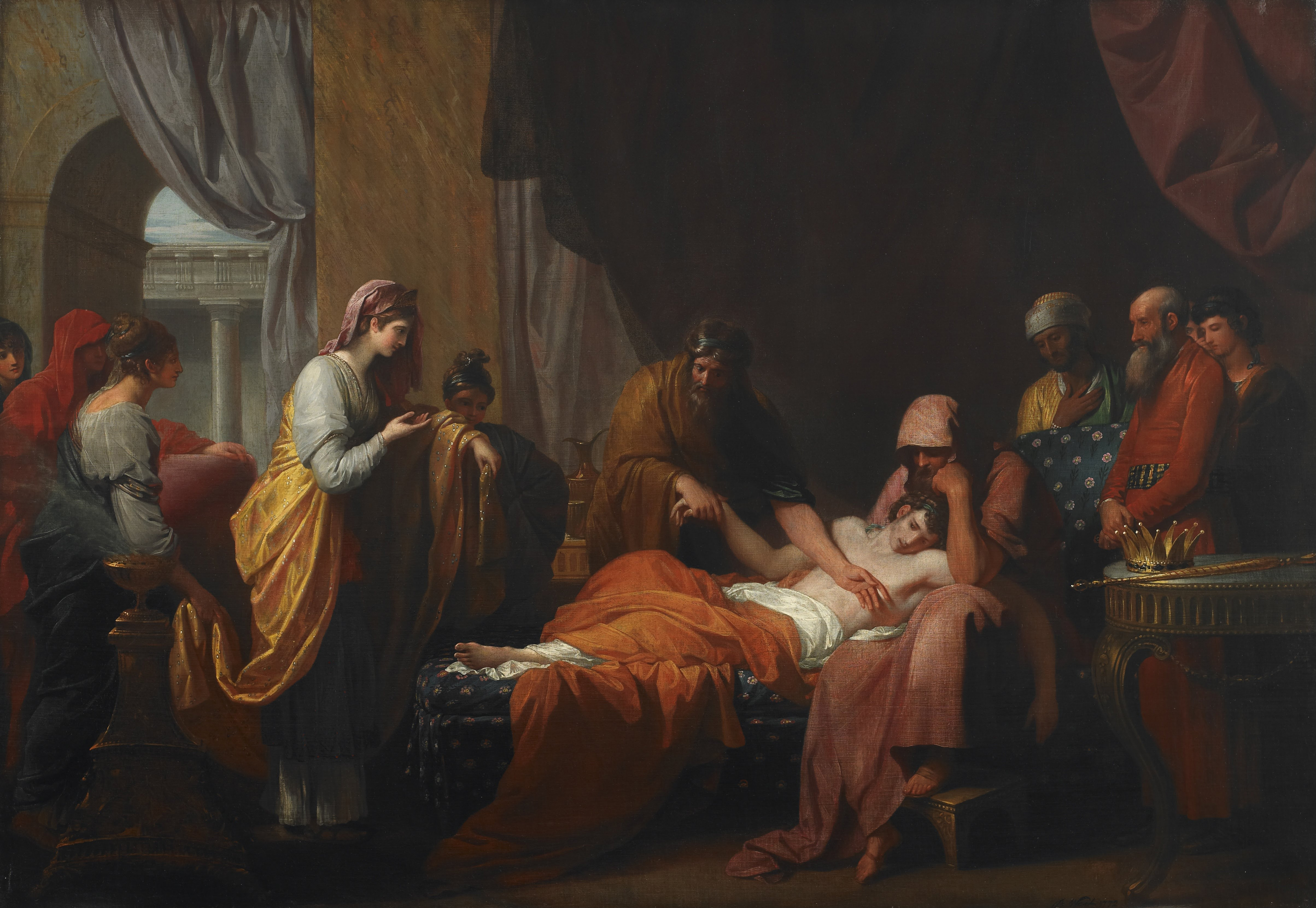
Erasistratus discovers that the source of Antiochus' illness is his love for Stratonice, by measuring his heartbeat when she enters the room—painting by Benjamin West

Sexual intercourse was often prescribed as a treatment for lovesickness by early Greek and Roman physicians. In one historical case, the Greek physician Erasistratus was called by King Seleucus of Syria to diagnose the illness of his son, Prince Antiochus. Erasistratus observed Antiochus' symptoms when different women entered the room, and upon discovering that Antiochus' illness was in fact his lovesickness for the king's wife Stratonice (Antiochus' young stepmother), Erasistratus recommended to Seleucus that he give up his wife to save his son, believing this would cure him. The king obliged, and later Antiochus and Stratonice were wed.

Remedia Amoris by the Roman poet Ovid has been called the first known treatise on lovesickness. A strong parallel has been recognized between the descriptions and advice given by Ovid, and the modern-day literature on addiction. Lovesickness is presented by Ovid as both a physical malady (with insomnia and withdrawal as symptoms), and also a disease of the will, impairing personal agency. On the subject of his own lovesickness, Ovid laments:

I would not dare excuse my dreadful morals,
Or with a war of lies my faults defend.
I own my sins—if good can come from owning—
Madman, I own them—and I still offend.
I hate myself, but can't not do the thing I
Hate, though I try. How hard a burden seems
One longs to shed! My self-control has failed me,
I'm swept away like boats on rushing streams.

For recovery, Ovid recommends to "keep busy" and avoid any triggers which could reignite the lovesick individual's diminishing passion (comparable to abstinence-based unlearning of the behavior) and to contemplate the defects of the beloved.

In the Middle Ages, unrequited love was considered "a trauma which, for the medieval melancholic, was difficult to relieve." Treatments included light therapy, rest, exposure to nature, and a diet of lamb, lettuce, fish, eggs, and ripe fruit. In the Middle Ages, lovesickness was often explained by an imbalance in the humors. An excess of black bile, the humor correlated with melancholy, was usually considered the cause.

Ancient and classical authors emphasized the physical manifestations of love more so than the psychological. Lovesickness as a diagnosis fell out of popularity among doctors around the 18th and 19th centuries, due to the decline of Hippocratic principles and humorism in medicine. This shift required a new explanation for the symptoms of lovesickness, which instead became attributed to having "too much sensibility" (a term used for emotional sensitivity).

In 1915, Sigmund Freud asked rhetorically, "Isn't what we mean by 'falling in love' a kind of sickness and craziness, an illusion, a blindness to what the loved person is really like?"

== Biological research ==
=== Addiction ===
The early stage of romantic love is being compared to a behavioral addiction (i.e., addiction to a non-substance) but the "substance" involved is the loved person. Addiction involves a phenomenon known as incentive salience, also called "wanting" (in quotes). This is the property by which cues in the environment stand out to a person and become attention-grabbing and attractive, like a "motivational magnet" which pulls a person towards a particular reward. Incentive salience differs from craving in that craving is a conscious experience while incentive salience may or may not be. While incentive salience can give feelings of strong urgency to cravings, it can also motivate behavior unconsciously, as in an experiment where cocaine users were unaware of their own decisions to choose a low dose of cocaine (which they believed was placebo) more often than an actual placebo. In the incentive-sensitization theory of addiction, repeated drug use renders the brain hypersensitive to drugs and drug cues, resulting in pathological levels of "wanting" to use drugs. People in love are thought to experience incentive salience in response to their beloved. Lovers share other similarities with addicts as well, like tolerance, dependence, withdrawal, relapse, craving, and mood modification.

=== Obsession ===
Obsessive thinking about a loved one has been called a hallmark or a cardinal trait of romantic love, ensuring that the loved one is not forgotten. Some reports have been made that people can even spend as much as 85 to 100% of their days and nights thinking about a love object. One study found that on average people in love spent 65% of their waking hours thinking about their beloved. Another study used cluster analysis to find several different groups of lovers, with the least intense group spending 35% of their time on average and the most intense at 72%. Since the late 1990s, these obsessional features have been compared to obsessive–compulsive disorder (OCD). This is also sometimes paired with a theory that obsessive (or intrusive) thinking is related to serotonin levels being lowered while in love, although study results have been inconsistent or negative. Another theory relates obsessive thinking to addiction, because drug users exhibit obsessive thoughts about drug use as well as compulsions.

=== Brain scans ===
In 2010, Helen Fisher, Arthur Aron and colleagues published their fMRI experiment investigating which areas of the brain might be active in recently rejected lovers. Participants had been in a relationship with their ex-partner for an average of 21 months, and then were post-rejection for an average of 63 days at the time of the experiment. These participants reported spending more than 85% of their waking hours thinking of their rejector, reported a lack of emotional control, and exhibited unhappiness, with sometimes more extreme emotions like depression, anger, and even paranoia in pre- and post-interviews.

Similar to other fMRI experiments of people in love, the scan while looking at a photograph of the rejecting partner showed activations in dopaminergic reward system areas, like the ventral tegmental area and nucleus accumbens. These activations were also stronger than in a previous experiment of participants who were happily in love. The active nucleus accumbens, prefrontal cortex, and orbitofrontal cortex have been associated with assessing one's gains and losses, and active areas of the insular cortex and anterior cingulate cortex have been involved with physical pain and pain regulation (respectively) in other studies.

== In the arts ==
O Rose, thou art sick!
The invisible worm
That flies in the night,
In the howling storm,

Has found out thy bed
Of crimson joy:
And his dark secret love
Does thy life destroy.

— William Blake, The Sick Rose

The depiction of lovesickness in the form of a depressed, melancholic lover is more of a cliché of medieval and modern literature, although it was present in ancient literature as well.

In ancient literature, a frustrated lover was instead frequently depicted as violent and manic, involving murder or suicide. One such example is Medea, from ancient Greece, whose obsessive love for Jason escalates to murder. The ancient Greeks called obsessive love "theia mania" (the madness from the gods). In ancient Rome, Dido's love for Aeneas is a wound which burns like fire; Dido commits suicide as a result. Like Medea, Dido's love is depicted as the force of a divine scheme.

The poet Sappho's phainetai moi has been called the most famous example of lovesickness.

In the Middle Ages, lovesickness took on a new importance as a feature of courtly love, a body of literature which explored themes of unrequited love, inaccessibility, or separation, with suffering as a core characteristic. In the phenomenon of courtly love, the symptoms became expressed through idealization and service to the lady, in a manner as if to a feudal lord (or suzerain). Courtly love went on to influence attitudes towards love in Western culture—being incorporated into the cultural tradition of romantic love.

Lovesickness is depicted in Shakespeare's Romeo and Juliet, a story of teen suicide "generally regarded as the greatest romance in the English language" according to Stanton Peele. Peele says the pair "stand as a summary of individual and environmental forces in love addiction". At the end of the play, the pair commits suicide over a misunderstanding wherein Juliet appears dead due to the effects of a potion: Romeo poisons himself upon finding her, then Juliet stabs herself after waking up.

Modern gothic metal songs thematize lovesickness from medieval literary influences. "This emotional and physical distress is a key element of fin'amor that echoes into Gothic metal", according to The Oxford Handbook of Music and Medievalism. "In particular, lovesickness was associated with desires and passions that remained unfulfilled, resulting in symptoms such as sleeplessness, sighing, and loss of appetite, all of which were considered manifestations of the mind's efforts to restrain its passions."

== See also ==
- Biology of romantic love – Evolution and neuroscience of romantic love
- Broken heart – Intense stress or pain one feels at experiencing longing
- Eros (concept) – Ancient Greek concept of sensual or passionate love
- Erotomania – Romantic delusional disorder
- Hi-wa itck – Mojave syndrome triggered by separation of a loved one
- Infatuation – Intense but irrational attraction
- Limerence – Love madness or intense infatuation
- Love addiction – Proposed disorder of problematic passion & distress
- Obsessive love – Possessiveness and inability to accept rejection
- Passionate and companionate love – Two basic love feelings
- Pathological jealousy – Psychological disorder
- Relationship obsessive–compulsive disorder
- Unrequited love – Love that is not reciprocated
