= Love addiction =

Proposed disorder of problematic passion & distress

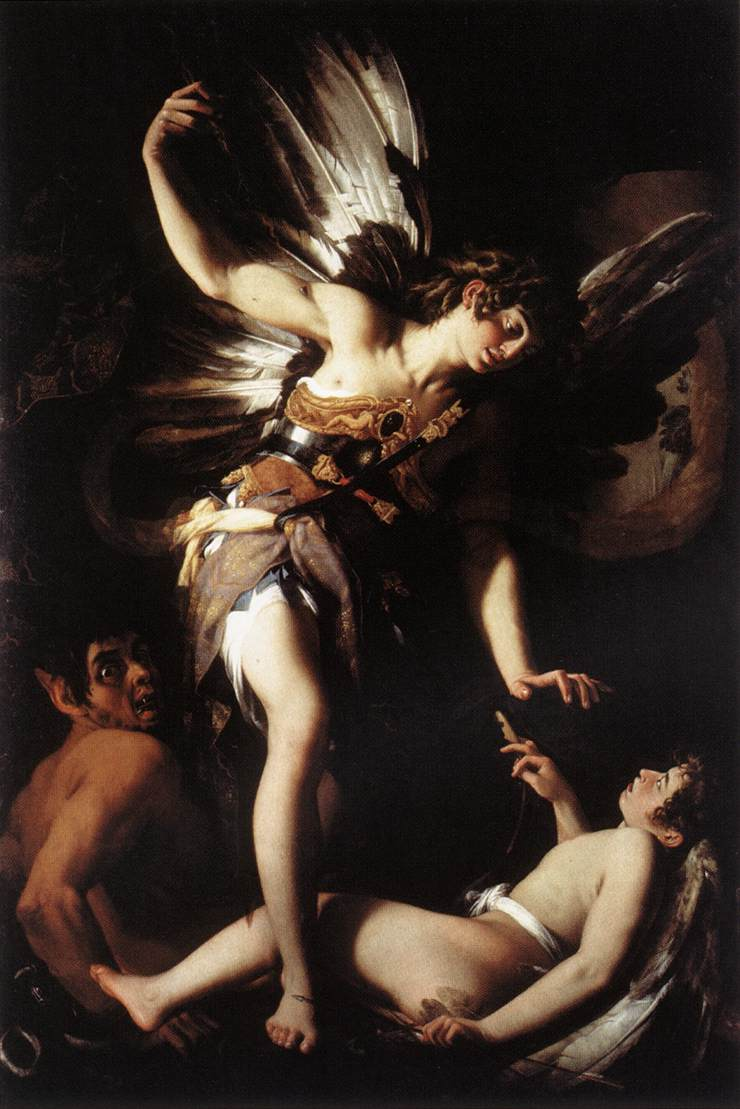
Divine Love Conquering Earthly Love (1602–03) by Giovanni Baglione.

Love addiction is a proposed disorder concept involving love relations characterized by severe distress and problematic passion-seeking despite adverse consequences. Academics do not currently agree on a precise definition of love addiction or when it needs to be treated. Love addiction can be contrasted with passionate love (the early stage of romantic love) which may be intense but still be prosocial and positive when reciprocated. Research on the biology of romantic love indicates that passionate love resembles a behavioral addiction, but it has evolved for the purpose of pair bonding.

A 2010 medical inquiry concluded that medical evidence at the time did not have definitions or criteria to classify love addiction as a disorder. Furthermore, the authors state there is a risk of misunderstanding and "overmedicalizing" people who experience it. The term "love addiction" does not appear in the Diagnostic and Statistical Manual of Mental Disorders (DSM), a compendium of mental disorders and diagnostic criteria published by the American Psychiatric Association.

Love addiction is different from codependence, although historically the concepts have been conflated as if synonymous. Love addiction has also been compared to (as analogous to or encompassing) the concepts of obsessive love, lovesickness and limerence.

== Definition ==
Defining an addictive disorder which revolves around love passion is difficult because passionate love (also called "infatuation") normally has features which resemble addiction. People in love experience salience, they yearn for their beloved, and the amourous stage resembles "getting high". One of the major differences between love and drug addiction is that the addictive aspects of passionate love tend to fade away in a relationship, whereas the condition of a drug addiction tends to worsen over time.

A team of bioethicists including Brian Earp and Julian Savulescu have drawn a distinction between two views on how the relationship between love and addiction can be conceptualized:

- In a narrow view, love might be considered an addiction when it's the result of abnormal brain processes. This is similar to an emerging viewpoint on drug addiction that the brain processes which are responsible for addiction do not exist in the brains of non-addicted people. Drugs of abuse artificially 'co-opt' neurotransmitter systems to produce reward signals which are much higher than could be achieved by natural rewards or with normal functioning. There is also some evidence that certain cases like binge eating and gambling addiction may elicit responses similar to drugs in some susceptible people. In the narrow view of love addiction then, "only extreme, radical brain processes, attachment behaviors, or manifestations of love" could indicate addiction, and it may be a rare condition.
- In a broad view, all love might be considered addiction. In this case, addiction may be "a spectrum of motivation" for any type of reward, like an appetite one can develop via reward conditioning, which is an evolved mechanism. This includes drugs, but also food for example, given that the human appetite for food can sometimes be contrary to real nutritive needs. In this way, perhaps everyone is "addicted" to food, sex, etc., although not to the point of distress or needing treatment. In the broad view of love addiction then, "to love someone is literally to be addicted to them". Helen Fisher, Arthur Aron and colleagues have proposed that romantic love is a "natural" addiction, evolved for pair bonding, which is a "positive addiction" (i.e., not harmful) when requited and a "negative addiction" when unrequited or inappropriate.

In their 2010 proposal, Reynaud et al. defined addiction as "the stage where desire becomes a compulsive need, when suffering replaces pleasure, when one persists in the relationship despite knowledge of adverse consequences (including humiliation and shame)."

Another group favoring the six components model of addiction by Mark Griffiths (salience, mood modification, tolerance, withdrawal, conflict and relapse) states that "Individuals addicted to love tend to experience negative moods and affects when away from their partners and have the strong urge and craving to see their partner as a way of coping with stressful situations."

== Types ==
A 2025 review has raised the question of identifying subtypes, because of the heterogeneity of clinical descriptions. For example, the diagnosis might apply either to individuals who fall in love quickly with a different partner as soon as the passionate phase of a relationship ends, or to individuals who are unable to break off maladaptive relationships.

Authors such as Helen Fisher include those "who have been rejected or broken up with" as love addicts.

Dorothy Tennov's concept of limerence (i.e., all-absorbing infatuated love, commonly for an unreachable person) has been likened to love addiction. Tennov's research, however, suggested to her that limerence is normal (although illogical), and a 2025 survey suggested that as many as 50–60% of the population had experienced it. Stanton Peele has commented on Tennov's work, calling limerence a "clinical condition" and "a severe emotional disability, one that leads people (primarily women) desperately to pursue often inappropriate love objects, frequently to fail at relationships, and to be incapable of learning from such experiences so that their ardor and desperation are often increased by their failures at love". Limerence has also been called "romance addiction", in reference to its relation to the concept of "romantic love".

Susan Peabody, a co-founder of Love Addicts Anonymous, has defined four types of love addicts:

- Obsessed Love Addicts, who are always head over heels for the wrong person—somebody unavailable, distant, noncommittal, abusive, and so on.
- Codependent Love Addicts, who tend to suffer from low self-esteem and desperately hold onto relationships by taking care of a partner with codependent behavior.
- Relationship Addicts, who are no longer in love with their partners, but still cannot let go despite being unhappy, because they're afraid of being alone.
- Ambivalent Love Addicts, who crave love but fear intimacy, so they become addicted to romantic fantasies about unavailable people, or prefer romantic affairs over committed relationships.

== History ==
External image
- The history of the concept
- via The Internet Archive
- The History and Rise of Sex and Love Addiction (INFOGRAPHIC)

It was Stanton Peele & Archie Brodsky who brought love addiction into the literature with their 1975 book Love and Addiction, arguably being the most cited work, although precursors to the concept had been described by earlier authors.

The term "love addict" is believed to have been first coined in 1928 by the Hungarian psychoanalyst Sandor Rado. However, even earlier, Sigmund Freud had observed a similarity between love passion and drug addiction, also having published his case study of Sergei Pankejeff (the "Wolf Man") whose "compulsive attacks" of falling in love "came on and passed off by sudden fits". In 1945, the psychoanalyst Otto Fenichel defined "love addicts" as "persons in whom the affection or the confirmation they receive from external objects plays the same role as food in the case of food addicts. Although they are unable to return love, they absolutely need an object by whom they feel loved, but only as an instrument to procure the condensed oral gratification."

Most relevant research began after the publication of Peele & Brodsky's Love and Addiction, in 1975. The book sought to show how drugs are not uniquely addictive, and that people can become addicted to any type of sufficiently rewarding activity, an idea which would have been met with skepticism in its time. Through the book's success, that idea is now commonplace. The authors, however, have called that the "less important half" of their argument, which more importantly (in their view) also criticized the notion that addiction is a "disease". The disease model of addiction was popularized from the 1970s and into the '80s as a facet of Alcoholics Anonymous and other twelve-step programs, then found its way into other self-help material, and this is how "love addiction" entered popular vocabulary. According to Peele, his main points became sidelined then, as Love and Addiction was actually "a social commentary on how our society defines and patterns intimate relationships...all of this social dimension has been removed, and the attention to love addiction has been channeled in the direction of regarding it as an individual, treatable psychopathology."

The twelve-step program Sex and Love Addicts Anonymous (SLAA) was founded in 1976, by a Boston musician who had been a member of Alcoholics Anonymous, but additionally struggled with out of control sexual behaviors of extramarital affairs and masturbation. This led him to seek out others who also believed they were suffering from sex and love addiction, and they began holding meetings to try to stop their obsessive and compulsive behaviors. SLAA has been estimated to hold over 1,200 meetings, with 16,000 members in over 42 countries. However, according to a 2010 review of the topic, most people who attend SLAA meetings may actually be there for sexual dependence (for men) or relationship dependence (for women), rather than for love addiction.

Another group is Love Addicts Anonymous (LAA), which focuses on love addiction specifically. LAA was founded in 2004 by Susan Peabody and Howard Gold, as a safe place for recovery from "unhealthy dependency on love as it plays out in our fantasies and relationships". LAA believes that love addiction and sex addiction are different.

== Neuroscience ==
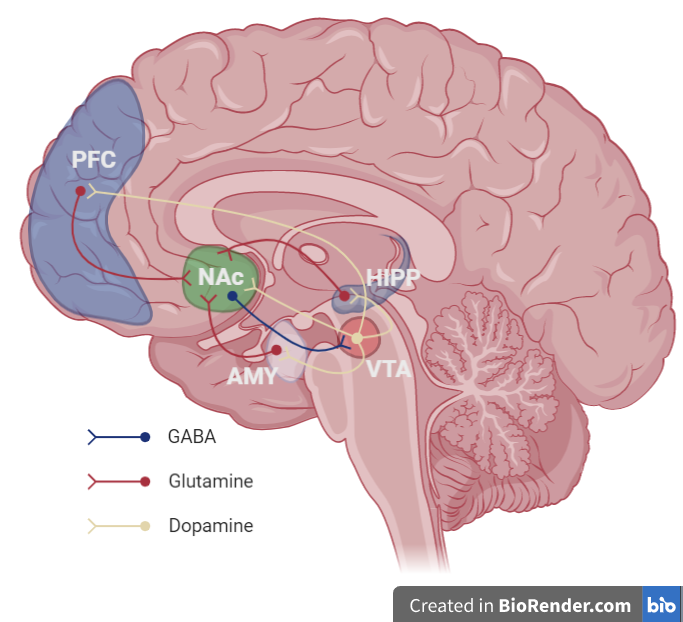
Key connections in the mesocorticolimbic pathway.

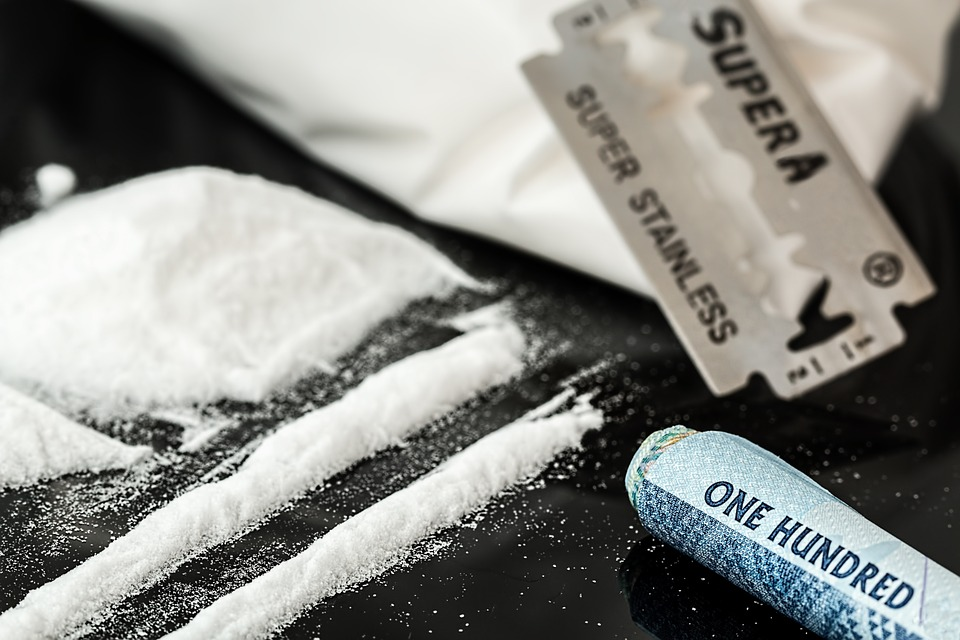
Love acts in a manner "not unlike cocaine"; both work on the dopamine system.

=== Reward & motivation ===
The early stage of romantic love is being compared to a behavioral addiction (i.e., addiction to a non-substance) but the "substance" involved is the loved person. Addiction involves a phenomenon known as incentive salience, also called "wanting" (in quotes). This is the property by which cues in the environment stand out to a person and become attention-grabbing and attractive, like a "motivational magnet" which pulls a person towards a particular reward. Incentive salience differs from craving in that craving is a conscious experience while incentive salience may or may not be. While incentive salience can give feelings of strong urgency to cravings, it can also motivate behavior unconsciously, as in an experiment where cocaine users were unaware of their own decisions to choose a low dose of cocaine (which they believed was placebo) more often than an actual placebo. In the incentive-sensitization theory of addiction, repeated drug use renders the brain hypersensitive to drugs and drug cues, resulting in pathological levels of "wanting" to use drugs. People in love are thought to experience incentive salience in response to their beloved. Lovers share other similarities with addicts as well, like tolerance, dependence, withdrawal, relapse, craving, and mood modification.

Incentive salience is mediated by dopamine projections in the mesocorticolimbic pathway of the brain, an area generally involved with reward, motivation, and reinforcement learning. Dopamine signaling for incentive salience originates in the ventral tegmental area (VTA) and projects to areas such as the nucleus accumbens (NAc) in the ventral striatum. The VTA is one of two main areas of the brain with neurons which produce dopamine (the other being the substantia nigra pars compacta). Projections from the VTA innervate the NAc, where dopamine activity attaches motivational significance to stimuli associated with rewards. Brain scans of people in love using fMRI (commonly while looking at a photograph of their beloved) show activations in these areas like the VTA and NAc. Another dopamine-rich area of the reward system shown to be active in romantic love is the caudate nucleus, containing 80% of the brain's dopamine receptor sites, located in the dorsal striatum. The dorsal striatum is implicated in reinforcement learning, and the caudate nucleus has shown activity in response to a monetary reward and cocaine. This activity in reward and motivation areas suggests that early-stage intense romantic love is a motivation system or goal-oriented state (rather than a specific emotion), consistent with the description of romantic love as a desire or longing for union with another person. These activations are also consistent with the similarity between romantic love and addiction.

In addiction research, a distinction is drawn between "wanting" a reward (i.e., incentive salience, tied to mesocorticolimbic dopamine) and "liking" a reward (i.e., pleasure, tied to hedonic hotspots), aspects which are dissociable. People can be addicted to drugs and compulsively seek them out, even when taking the drug no longer results in a high or the addiction is detrimental to one's life. They can also irrationally "want" (i.e. feel compelled towards, in the sense of incentive salience) something which they do not cognitively wish for. In a similar way, people who are in love may "want" a loved person even when interactions with them are not pleasurable. For example, they may want to contact an ex-partner after a rejection, even when the experience will only be painful. It is also possible for a person to be "in love" with somebody they do not like, or who treats them poorly.

=== Endogenous opioids ===
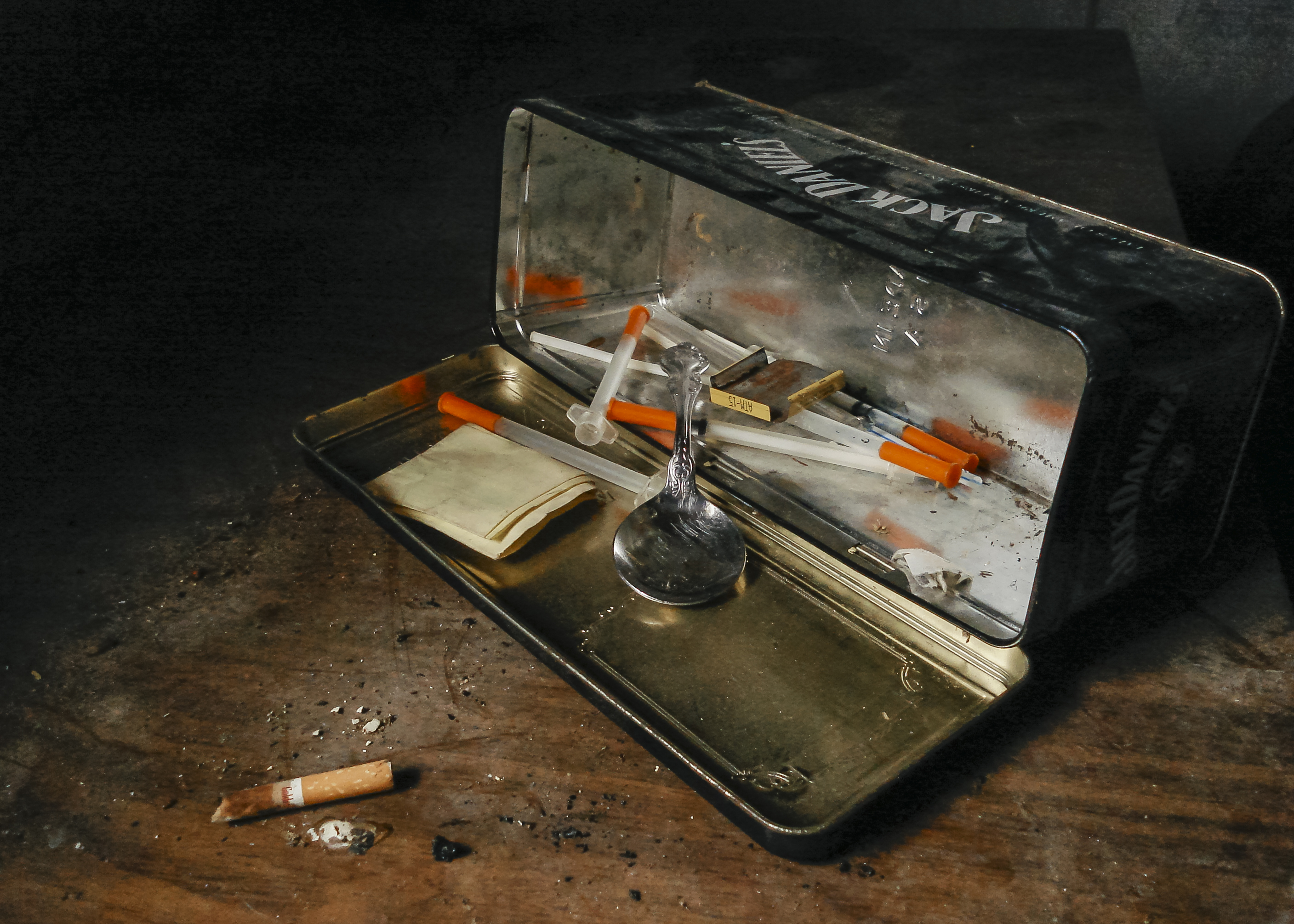
Addictive love has been compared to both cocaine and heroin addiction.

Modern research is increasingly showing the importance of endogenous opioids in love and social attachment, particularly the β-endorphin (the most potent endogenous opioid) and the μ-opioid receptor system. While opioids have their origin being the body's natural painkiller, they're also implicated in a variety of other systems, essentially like neurotransmitters. Opioid receptors are located throughout the brain, including in the limbic system (affecting basic emotions) and neocortex (affecting more conscious decision-making). Opioids are linked to the consummatory part of reward, or i.e. "liking" or pleasure, and released in areas of the brain called hedonic hotspots (or pleasure centers). Hedonic hotspots are located in the nucleus accumbens, the ventral pallidum and other areas. This function includes social reward, or the pleasurable aspect of social interactions.

The brain opioid theory of social attachment (BOTSA) is a long-running theory summarizing this connection, originally formulated in the 1980s and 1990s, based on a proposal by the psychiatrist Michael Liebowitz and research by the neuroscientist Jaak Panksepp. Starting in the 1990s, opioids were overshadowed by the interest in oxytocin and largely overlooked until more recently, possibly because of the difficulty studying them (requiring e.g. a PET scan, which is expensive). Opioids have been connected to a variety of social experiences, including the early stage of romantic love and attachment styles. While the addictive aspects of love have been compared to cocaine or amphetamine addiction, other aspects may also resemble an opioid addiction.

=== Obsessive thinking ===
Obsessive thinking about a loved one has been called a hallmark or a cardinal trait of romantic love, ensuring that the loved one is not forgotten. Some reports have been made that people can even spend as much as 85 to 100% of their days and nights thinking about a love object. One study found that on average people in love spent 65% of their waking hours thinking about their beloved. Another study used cluster analysis to find several different groups of lovers, with the least intense group spending 35% of their time on average and the most intense at 72%. Since the late 1990s, these obsessional features have been compared to obsessive–compulsive disorder (OCD). This is also sometimes paired with a theory that obsessive (or intrusive) thinking is related to serotonin levels being lowered while in love, although study results have been inconsistent or negative. Another theory relates obsessive thinking to addiction, because drug users exhibit obsessive thoughts about drug use as well as compulsions.

== Cultural references ==
- In A Spy in the House of Love, the heroine Sabina is said to have seen her 'love anxieties as resembling those of a drug addict, of alcoholics, of gamblers. The same irresistible impulse, tension, compulsion and then depression following the yielding to the impulse, revulsion, bitterness, depression, and the compulsion once more'. As a result, she has been subsequently described as 'feeling like a "love addict" enslaved to obsessive-compulsive patterns of behaviour'.
- St. Augustine, quoted in Confessions as saying "to Carthage then I came, where a cauldron of unholy loves sang all about my ears", has been interpreted as 'fundamentally, what one might call a "love addict"' who 'poured out his soul upon his beloved; in so doing, he tended to "lose" himself in these relationships', setting the stage for 'pain and confusion when his beloved was torn away'.
- Romeo and Juliet "stand as a summary of individual and environmental forces in love addiction", according to Stanton Peele. Romeo and Juliet were also called a case of "mutual limerence" by Dorothy Tennov.

== See also ==
- Biology of romantic love – Evolution and neuroscience of romantic love
- Broken heart – Intense stress or pain one feels at experiencing longing
- Codependence – Type of relationship
- Compulsive sexual behaviour disorder – Mental disorder
- Disease model of addiction – Description of an addiction as a disease
- Fatal attraction (sociology) – When qualities leading to attraction lead to breakup
- Limerence – Love madness or intense infatuation
- Lovesickness – Mental state of unfulfilled or unrequited love
- Obsessive love – Possessiveness and inability to accept rejection
- Passionate and companionate love – Two basic love feelings
- Pornography addiction – Compulsive sexual behaviour
- Romantic love (mental state) – Mental state of being in love
- Sexual addiction – Proposed compulsive sexual disorder
- Unrequited love – Love that is not reciprocated
