= Freak =

Unusual person

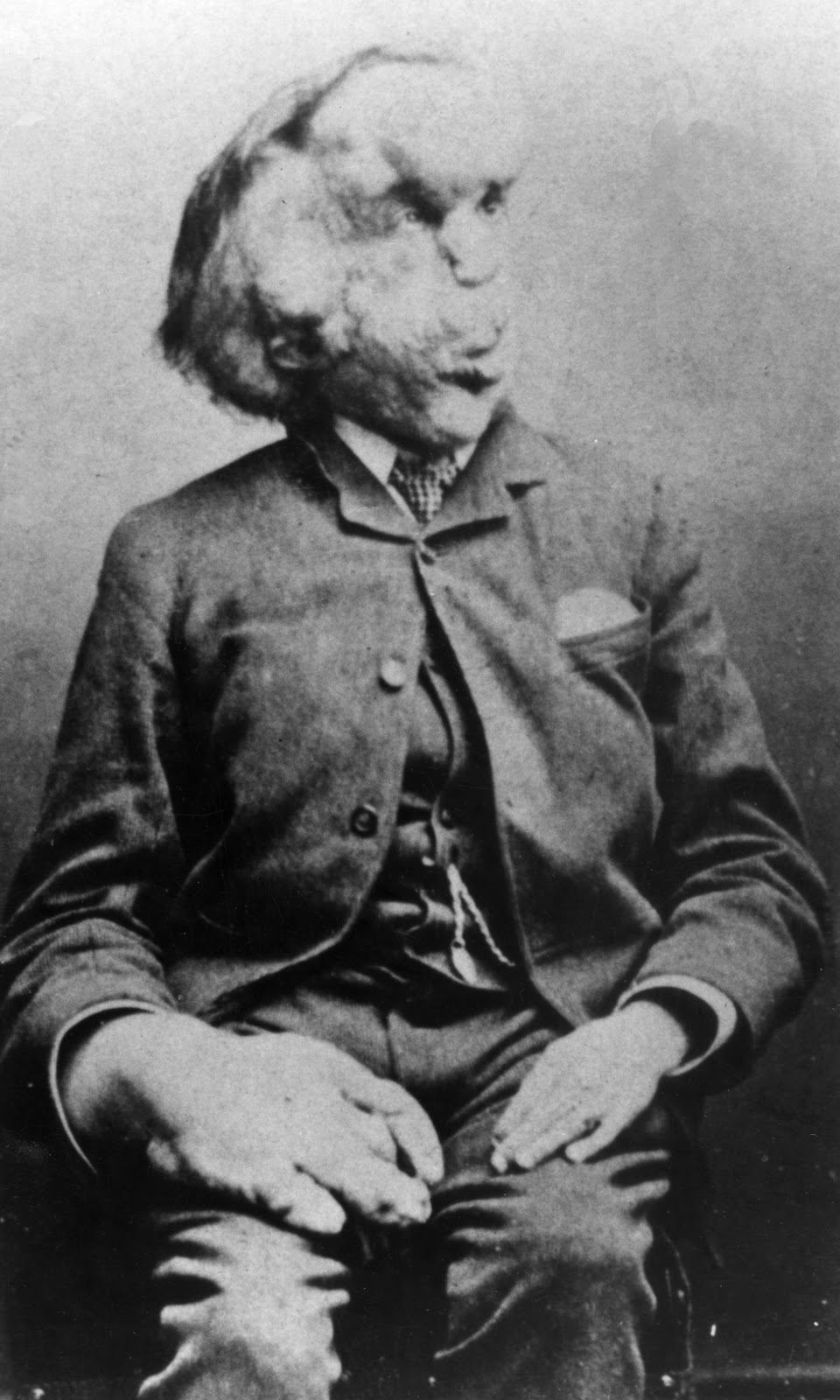
Joseph Merrick ("The Elephant Man"), c.1889

A freak is a person who is physically deformed or transformed due to an extraordinary medical condition or body modification. This definition was first attested with this meaning in the 1880s as a shorter form of the phrase "freak of nature", itself a broader term meaning "whimsy or caprice of nature", attributed at least as far back as 1847. The term's original neutral connotation became entirely negative during the 20th century; therefore, freak with its literal meaning of "abnormally developed individual" is viewed purely as a pejorative today. However, the term is also recently used playfully to refer to an enthusiast or obsessive person, as in a fitness freak or control freak.

== Usage ==
Freak saw usage as jargon by promoters and performers of freak shows, though its use in this sense has decreased along with the popularity of freak shows. One well-known example of this word was in reference to Joseph Merrick, the "Elephant Man." As a jargon, side-show freaks were classified into two groups: natural freaks and self-made freaks. A natural freak would usually have been born with a genetic abnormality, while a self-made freak was a person who was altered artificially (with methods such as surgical implants).

The term has a variety of much more recent meanings. An example is something strikingly unusual about one's appearance or behavior. This usage originated from "freak scene" during the 1960s and 1970s, most famously promoted by the album Freak Out! made by the rock band The Mothers of Invention.

A recent usage of freak is as a synonym for enthusiast, such as a health freak (Note: For example, in the name of the British television show, Teenage Health Freak.); or referring to obsessive behavior, such as control freak.

== In science ==
Freak is used in science to describe plants and animals with a genetic mutation.

== See also ==
- Ableism
- Deviance (sociology)
- Social rejection
- Teratology
