= Sexual obsessions =

Persistent thoughts about sexual activity

Sexual obsessions are persistent and unrelenting thoughts about sexual activity. In the context of obsessive–compulsive disorder (OCD), these are extremely common and can become extremely debilitating, making the person ashamed of the symptoms and reluctant to seek help. A preoccupation with sexual matters, however, does not only occur as a symptom of OCD, and may be enjoyable in other contexts (i.e., sexual fantasy).

== Obsessive–compulsive disorder ==
Obsessive–compulsive disorder involves unwanted thoughts or images that are unsettling or interfere with an individual's life, followed by actions that temporarily relieve the anxiety caused by the obsessions. Obsessions are involuntary, repetitive, and unwelcome. Attempts to suppress or neutralize obsessions do not work and in fact make the obsessions more severe, as trying to make sense of obsessions only gives them more attention and "fuel".

Typical obsessive themes center on contamination, illness, worries about disaster, and orderliness. However, people with OCD also obsess about violence, religious questions, and sexual experiences. Up to a quarter of people with OCD may experience sexual obsessions, and some OCD sexual obsessions have been linked to childhood sexual abuse of OCD sufferers. Repetitive sexual thoughts are seen in many disorders in addition to OCD, but these disorders bear no relation to OCD. For example, sexual thoughts unrelated to OCD are common to people with paraphilias, post-traumatic stress disorder, sexual dysfunction, or sexual addiction. The recurrent sexual thoughts and feelings in these situations are sometimes referred to as sexual obsessions which may include a person's sexual orientation, doubts and or fears about being homosexual or being viewed by others as homosexual. However, their content, form, and meaning vary depending on the disorder, with OCD sexual obsessions being not only involuntary but also unwanted, and causing mental distress and suffering for the person with OCD.

=== Sexual focus ===
Because sex carries significant emotional, moral, and religious importance, it often becomes a magnet for obsessions in people predisposed to OCD. Common themes include unfaithfulness, deviant behaviors, pedophilia, the unfaithfulness or suitability of one's partner, and thoughts combining religion and sex. People with sexual obsessions may have legitimate concerns about their attractiveness, potency, or partner, which can serve as an unconscious catalyst for the obsessions.

Sexual obsessions take many forms. For example, a mother might obsess about sexually abusing her child. She might wonder if these thoughts mean that she is a pedophile and worry that she could act them out, despite the fact that she has never sexually abused anyone and feels disgusted by the idea. Another example is a man who worries that he may accidentally impregnate a woman by shaking her hand because he was not careful enough in washing his hands after touching his genitals. Patients may also experience fears that their obsessions have already been carried out, and this causes them great mental distress and suffering. The ignorance and misunderstanding of the general population about OCD, largely as a result of misinformation about the disorder, often leads to assumptions that sufferers are criminals or deviants. This can then reinforce the belief in the mind of the sufferer that they really have committed a crime or immoral act, when they have not, or lead to doubts. This causes great distress for an OCD sufferer, and occasionally leads to the sufferer making "confessions" – sometimes to the police – and suicidal thoughts or attempts.

In the midst of the thoughts, the sexual obsessions may seem real. Occasionally, individuals with OCD believe that their obsession is true, and in such a case they would be said to have "poor insight". But the vast majority of people with OCD recognize at some point that their fears are extreme and unrealistic. The problem is that even though they know the obsession is false, it feels real. These individuals cannot understand why they are unable to dismiss the obsession from their minds. The obsession may temporarily subside in the face of a logical argument or reassurance from others, but may spike when caught off guard by a sexual trigger.

Sexual obsessions can be particularly troubling to the individual with OCD, as something important and cherished becomes twisted into its nightmarish opposite. People with sexual obsessions are particularly likely to have co-occurring aggressive and religious obsessions, clinical depression, and higher rates of impulse control disorders, though the latter is less common in OCD patients.

=== Self-doubt ===
The obsessions often reflect a vulnerable self-theme where the person doubts their real or actual self. Doubt and uncertainty linger with sexual obsessions. They provide several contradictions which include: uncertainty as to whether you would act on these or whether you have already acted upon them, and uncertainty as to whether you are liking the thoughts (even though you know you do not). These cause an increase in anxiety, doubt, and uncertainty.

Another form of OCD that can take hold of a person involves obsessive doubts, preoccupations, checking, and reassurance seeking behaviors focusing on intimate relationships (ROCD). As with sexual obsessions, and at times in response to them, a person may feel the need to end a perfectly good relationship based on their inability to feel how they want to. A person may continuously doubt whether they love their partner, whether their relationship is the "right" relationship or whether their partner "really" loves them. Another form of ROCD includes preoccupation, checking, and reassurance seeking behaviors relating to the partner's perceived flaws. Instead of finding good in their partner, they are constantly focused on their shortcomings.

=== Avoidance ===
In the same way that those who have OCD fears of contamination avoid anything that will "contaminate" them (i.e., doorknobs, puddles, shaking hands), those who are suffering from such sexual obsessions may feel an overpowering need to avoid all contact with anything that can cause them to have anxiety, or "spike". Such avoidance may include:

- Not looking at (for instance) another member of the same sex in the face,
- Avoiding locker rooms, showers, and beaches, etc. It can also mean avoiding sexual situations with members of a different sex, for fear of what a particular circumstance (not being aroused enough, intrusive thoughts, etc.) might mean.
- Avoiding hugging same sex children, including their own, a compulsion which may cause severe damage to the well-being of the child.
- Avoiding associating with gay or straight friends, or people with children. The social isolation feeds the anxiety, and therefore the OCD.

=== Sexual ideation ===
It cannot be overemphasized that the sexual obsessions in OCD are the opposite of the usual sexual daydream or fantasy. The thoughts are not really part of the person's identity, but they are the sort of thoughts or impulses the person with OCD fears that they may have. The sexual ideation in OCD is unpleasant and distressing for the person with OCD. The individual with OCD does not want the thought to become real. The idea of acting out the obsession fills the OCD victim with dread. The sexual ideation in such situations is termed ego-dystonic or ego-alien, meaning that the behavior and/or attitudes are seen by the individual as inconsistent with his or her fundamental beliefs and personality. Therefore, OCD can decrease libido.

The OCD sufferer may have a constant focus on not becoming aroused or checking that they do not become aroused, and this may lead to "groinal response". Many OCD sufferers take this groinal response as actual arousal, when in reality it is not. OCD sexual obsessions often result in guilt, shame and depression and may interfere with social functioning or work. Approximately 40% of sufferers (number could be higher due to the embarrassment associated) also report some accompanying physiological arousal. Reactions can include increased heart rate, a feeling of being turned on, and even erections in men, increased lubrication in women, and orgasm. This response typically generates more confusion and uncertainty. However, this is a conditioned physiological response in the primitive thalamus of a brain which does not identify the thought as sex with a particular person, but just sex. This is generally not indicative of one's own personal desires.

== Treatment ==
People with sexual obsessions can devote an excessive amount of time and energy attempting to understand the obsessions. They usually decide they are having these problems because they are defective in some way, and they are often too ashamed to seek help. Because sexual obsessions are not as well-described in the research literature, many therapists may fail to properly diagnose OCD in a client with primary sexual obsessions. Mental health professionals unfamiliar with OCD may even attribute the symptoms to an unconscious wish (typically in the case of psychoanalysts or psychodynamic therapists), sexual identity crisis, or hidden paraphilia. Sexual obsessions respond to the same type of effective treatments available for other forms of OCD: cognitive behavioral therapy and selective serotonin reuptake inhibitors (SSRIs). People with sexual obsessions may, however, need a longer and more aggressive course of treatment.

=== Medication ===
Medications specifically for OCD (typically SSRI medications) will help alleviate the anxiety but may also cause sexual dysfunction in about a third of patients. For many the relief from the anxiety is enough to overcome the sexual problems caused by the medication. For others, the medication itself makes sex truly impossible. if it persists, a psychiatrist can often adjust the medications to overcome this side effect.

== See also ==
- Pure (British TV series), which follows a woman with sexual OCD
