= Emotional blackmail =

Negative form of psychological control over another

The term emotional blackmail was popularized by clinical social worker Susan Forward about controlling people in relationships and the theory that fear, obligation and guilt (FOG) are the transactional dynamics at play between the controller and the person being controlled. Understanding these dynamics is useful to anyone trying to extricate themself from the controlling behavior of another person and deal with their own compulsions to do things that are uncomfortable, undesirable, burdensome, or self-sacrificing for others.

== General ==
The first documented use of "emotional blackmail" appeared in 1947 in the Journal of the National Association of Deans of Women in the article "Discipline and Group Psychology". The term was used to describe one type of problematic classroom control model often used by teachers. Esther Vilar, an Argentine physician and anti-feminist writer, also used the term "emotional blackmail" in the early 1970s to describe a parenting strategy observed among some mothers with multiple children.

Emotional blackmail typically involves two people who have established a close personal or intimate relationship (parent and child, spouses, siblings, or two close friends). Children, too, will employ special pleading and emotional blackmail to promote their own interests, and self-development, within the family system.

Emotional blackmailers use fear, obligation and guilt in their relationships, ensuring that others feel afraid to cross them, obligated to give them their way and swamped by guilt if they resist. Knowing that someone close to them wants love, approval or confirmation of identity and self-esteem, blackmailers may threaten to withhold them (e.g., withhold love) or take them away altogether, making the second person feel they must earn them by agreement. Fear, obligation or guilt is commonly referred to as "FOG". FOG is a contrived acronym—a play on the word "fog" which describes something that obscures and confuses a situation or someone's thought processes.

The person who is acting in a controlling way often wants something from the other person that is legitimate to want. They may want to feel loved, safe, valuable, appreciated, supported, needed, etc. This is not the problem. The problem is often more a matter of how they are going about getting what they want, or that they are insensitive to others' needs in doing so, and how others react to all of this.

Under pressure, one may become a sort of hostage, forced to act under pressure of the threat of responsibility for the other's breakdown. One could fall into a pattern of letting the blackmailer control his/her decisions and behavior, lost in what Doris Lessing described as "a sort of psychological fog".

== Types ==
Forward and Frazier identify four blackmail types each with their own mental manipulation style:

Type	Example
Punisher's threat	Eat the food they cooked for you or they'll hurt you.
Self-punisher's threat	Eat the food they cooked for you or they'll hurt themselves.
Sufferer's threat	Eat the food they cooked for you. They were saving it for themselves. They wonder what will happen now.
Tantalizer's threat	Eat the food they cooked for you and you just might or might not get a really yummy dessert.

There are different levels of demands—demands that are of little consequence, demands that involve important issues or personal integrity, demands that affect major life decisions, and/or demands that are dangerous or illegal.

== Patterns and characteristics ==
=== Addictions ===
Addicts often believe that being in control is how to achieve success and happiness in life. People who follow this rule use it as a survival skill, having usually learned it in childhood. As long as they make the rules, no one can back them into a corner with their feelings.

=== Personality disorders ===
People with certain mental conditions are predisposed to controlling behavior including those with paranoid personality disorder, borderline personality disorder, and narcissistic personality disorder.

People with borderline personality disorder are particularly likely to use emotional blackmail (as too are destructive narcissists). However, their actions may be impulsive and driven by fear and a desperate sense of hopelessness, rather than being the product of any conscious plan.

=== Codependency ===
Codependency often involves placing a lower priority on one's own needs, while being excessively preoccupied with the needs of others. Codependency can occur in any type of relationship, including family, work, friendship, and also romantic, peer or community relationships.

=== Affluenza and children ===
Affluenza—the status insecurity derived from obsessively keeping up with the Joneses—has been linked by Oliver James to a pattern of childhood training whereby sufferers were "subjected to a form of emotional blackmail as toddlers. Their mothers' love becomes conditional on exhibiting behaviour that achieved parental goals."

=== Assertiveness training ===
Assertiveness training encourages people to not engage in fruitless back-and-forths or power struggles with the emotional blackmailer but instead to repeat a neutral statement, such as "I can see how you feel that way," or, if pressured to eat, say "No thank you, I'm not hungry." They are taught to keep their statements within certain boundaries in order not to capitulate to coercive nagging, emotional blackmail, or bullying.

== Recovery ==
Techniques for resisting emotional blackmail include strengthening personal boundaries, resisting demands, developing a power statement — the determination to stand the pressure—and buying time to break old patterns. Re-connecting with the autonomous parts of the self the blackmailer had over-ruled is not necessarily easy. One may feel guilty based on emotional blackmail, even while recognizing the guilt as induced and irrational; but still be able to resist overcompensating, and ignore the blackmailer's attempt to gain attention by way of having a tantrum.

Consistently ignoring the manipulation in a friendly way may however lead to its intensification, and threats of separation, or to accusations of being "crazy" or a "home wrecker".

== Popular cultural examples ==
- Angela Carter described Beauty and the Beast as glorifying emotional blackmail on the part of the Beast, as a means of controlling his target, Beauty.
- Novelist Doris Lessing claimed that "I became an expert in emotional blackmail by the time I was five."

== Criticism ==
Daniel Miller objects that in popular psychology the idea of emotional blackmail has been misused as a defense against any form of fellow-feeling or consideration for others.

Labeling of this dynamic with inflammatory terms such as "blackmail" and "manipulation" may not be so helpful as it is both polarizing and it implies premeditation and malicious intent which is often not the case. Controlling behavior and being controlled is a transaction between two people with both playing a part.

== See also ==
- Appeal to emotion
- Codependency
- Controlling behavior
- Coercive persuasion
- Double bind
- Family nexus
- Guilt trip
- Manipulation
- Mind games
- Persuasion
- Punishment (psychology)
