= Susan Forward =

Author and clinical social worker

- Died: 2020
- Occupations: Clinical social worker, author, actress
- Notable work: Men Who Hate Women and the Women Who Love Them, Toxic Parents

Susan Forward was an American clinical social worker and best-selling author who coined the term "emotional blackmail". Her book Men Who Hate Women and the Women Who Love Them was a No. 1 New York Times best seller, and spent 40 weeks on the list. She appeared on many talk shows as a guest, including Oprah and The Today Show.

== Career ==
Earlier in her life, Forward was an actress who received a degree in theater arts from the University of California, Los Angeles. She is reported to have appeared in 50 television shows, including Perry Mason, Bonanza, Quincy, M.E. and The Twilight Zone. Acting was her childhood dream, but she abandoned it when she was 28.

Forward received her postgraduate education at the University of Southern California where she received a master's degree in psychiatric social work and a PhD in psychology and became licensed as a clinical social worker. Forward privately practiced for 24 years, and ran over 15,000 therapy groups in this time. She retired from her therapy practice in the late 1980s. She also hosted an ABC Talk Radio show for 6 years. In 1994, she hosted a 2-hour NBC special titled Best-Sellers: Men Who Hate Women and the Women Who Love Them: The Relationship.

During divorce proceedings between O. J. Simpson and Nicole Brown Simpson (who was later murdered), Mrs. Simpson paid Forward two visits for therapy. Forward later disclosed to the public (after the murder) that these visits had led her to believe that Mrs. Simpson had been abused. In 1994, a California regulatory body investigated whether Forward had violated confidentiality laws because of this disclosure. Forward had believed the disclosure was allowed, because of an incorrect belief that Mrs. Simpson's death voided her physician–patient privilege. This led to her license being suspended for 3 months and being put on probation for 3 years.

== Personal life ==
Forward was married twice, and has characterized both marriages as bad. She has characterized one husband as a 'Jekyll and Hyde' who verbally abused her; however, because she was madly in love with him, she found it difficult to leave the relationship. When she was 15, Forward was sexually abused by her father. She spoke out about the effects of sexual abuse on victims.

Forward died in 2020.
