= Control freak =

Colloquialism for a person obsessed with control

Control freak is a colloquialism for a person who feels a psychological need to constantly be in charge of things and people around them. A control freak can become distressed when they feel things are going out of control. The feel of the need to control is often attributed to the underlying fear of losing control over their lives.

This expression was introduced around the 1960s and it is not a clinical one.

== Characteristics ==
Control freaks tend to have a psychological need to be in charge of things and people – even circumstances that cannot be controlled. The need for control, in extreme cases, stems from deeper psychological issues such as obsessive–compulsive personality disorder (OCPD), anxiety disorders, or personality disorders.

Control freaks are often insecure and perfectionists. Additionally, they may even manipulate or pressure others to change to avoid having to change themselves. They may have had an overbearing mother or father. Furthermore, control freaks sometimes have similarities to codependents, in the sense that the latter's fear of abandonment leads to attempts to control those they are dependent on.

== Examples ==
- Steve Jobs — Steve Jobs was a perfectionist who favored the closed system of control over all aspects of a product from start to finish — what he termed the integrated over the fragmented approach. As Steve Wozniak, his long-term collaborator and occasional critic, put it: "Apple gets you into their playpen and keeps you there".
- Queen Victoria — A series of three documentary programs on BBC2 in the UK in January 2013 called Queen Victoria's Children argued that Queen Victoria was a pathological control freak by the way she controlled the welfare of all her children.

== See also ==
- Authoritarian personality
- Control (management)
- Micromanagement
- Nanny state
- Obsessive–compulsive personality disorder
- Obsessive love
- Pedant
