= Divine Love Conquering Earthly Love (Baglione) =

Painting by Giovanni Baglione

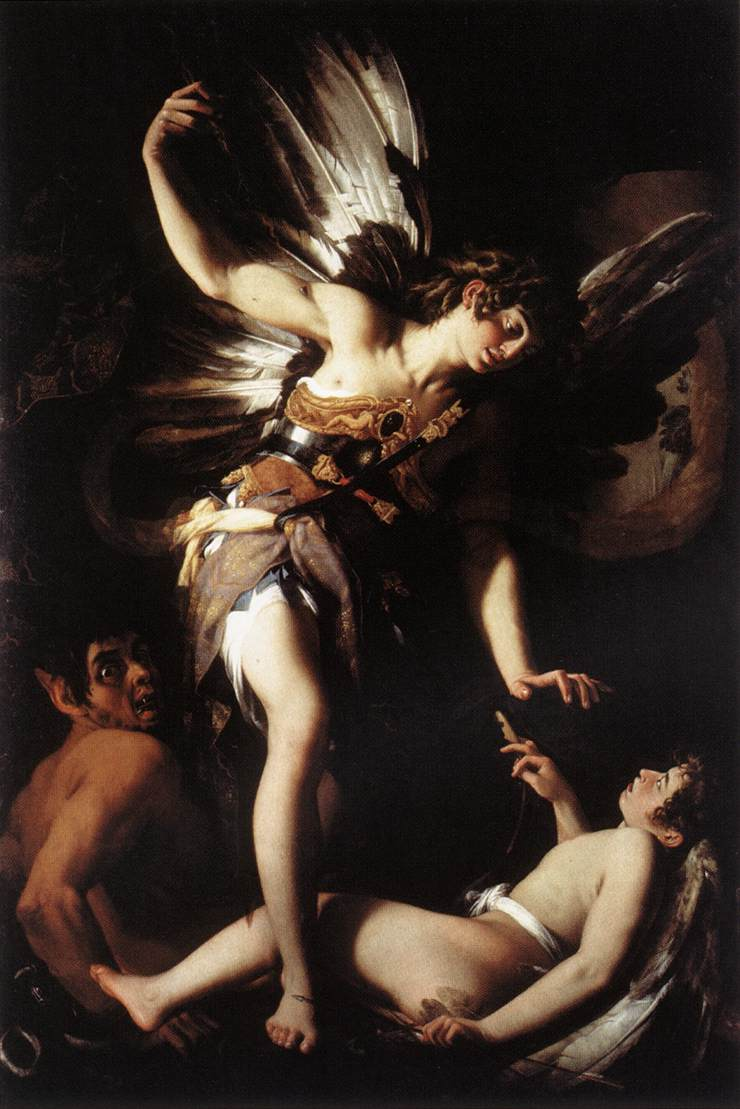
- Artist: Giovanni Baglione
- Year: 1602–1603
- Medium: Oil on canvas
- Location: Galleria Nazionale d'Arte Antica, Rome

Divine Love Conquering Earthly Love is an oil on canvas painting dating to 1602–1603, that is now held in the collection of the Galleria Nazionale d'Arte Antica in Palazzo Barberini, Rome. It was painted by Italian painter Giovanni Baglione. It is the second version that Baglione painted of this subject; the first version is now in the Gemäldegalerie, Staatliche Museen in Berlin. Both of these versions were painted for Cardinal Benedetto Giustiniani, an Italian clergyman.

The painting was done as a reference and competitive response to Caravaggio’s piece Love Victorious, with its debated symbolism of the figures and imagery. This resulted in a rivalry between Baglione and his contemporary, Caravaggio; Baglione accused Caravaggio of circulating poems that were disparaging the painting, which in 1603, resulted into a libel lawsuit.

== Description ==
Scholar Beverly Louise Brown states that the painting depicts Eros, the god of love and desire, as an armor-clad angel, as he draws back with his arms, aiming for a final thrust to kill the figure in the bottom right whom Brown also stated to be Cupid. The figure underneath Eros is a religious figure described as a provocatively naked beautiful young boy, with humanly features, as he lays defenseless on the ground. This depiction of the young boy was a challenge to his contemporaries' moral values.

In the background at the bottom left, there is a devil with faun ears, holding a trident as he crouches down with an anguished and surprise look facing the viewer.

This piece is a depiction of a battle between Eros and Anteros, the god of requited love, trying to win over the soul of a man. However, if the two individuals resolved their complication, then they would be achieving the perfect love.

Baglione used elements of Caravaggio’s style, by making the hue dark using an intense and direct spotlight to create a strong tenebrism contrast between the background and the foreground. Similarly to Caravaggio’s Love Victorious, the figures are close together in the plane, with the raking light covering only Eros and Cupid as the foreground. Along with this, Baglione was also able to demonstrate naturalism, or the new vision of Caravaggio.

However, Baglione does not fully adopt Caravaggio’s technique, and still maintains his traditional approach, Mannerism. Baglione applies his traditional techniques on the figures incorporating attenuated proportions, strained poses, and complex attire.

== First version ==
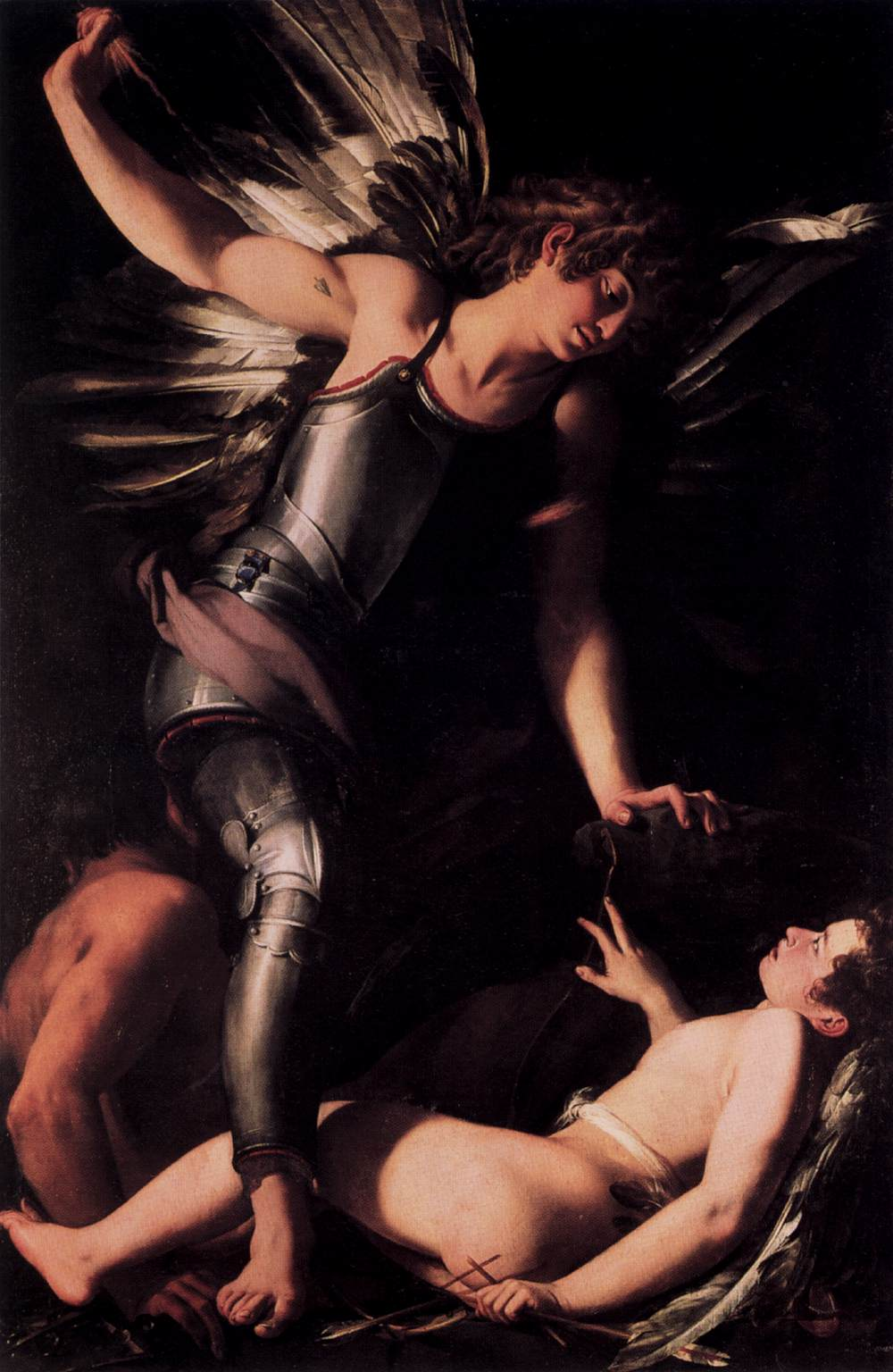
First version of Divine Love Conquering Earthly Love, 1602

The first version of the painting is called Divine Love Overcoming Profane Love and was painted in the year 1602. The painting is held in the German art museum, Gemäldegalerie, in Berlin. It is unknown why Baglione painted two versions of this painting; the first version was painted for Cardinal Benedetto Giustiniani. There are slight alterations that can be seen when compared to the second version.

In the first version, Eros is wearing a completely different and less decorated armor. The devil in the bottom left corner is not facing forward; instead the creature is hidden behind Eros. A last feature that can be seen is in the hand positions of both Eros and the human figure of the bottom right corner. Eros's raised right arm is facing outward in its attacking position, while the human figure in the bottom has a slight shift in his right raised hand as well.

== Second version ==
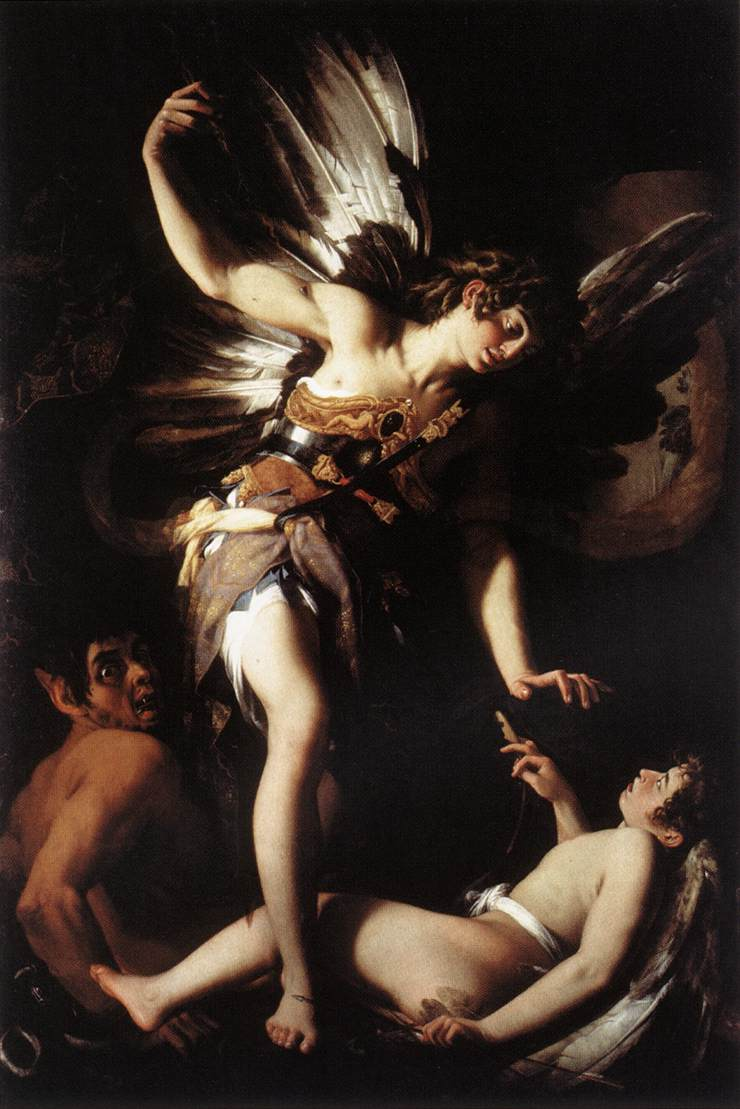
Second Version of Divine Love Conquering Earthly Love

It is believed that Baglione painted the second version after taking into account the criticism he received prior to the first version. Orazio Gentileschi originally had recommended to rework the figure Divine Love, or Eros, to be entirely nude or to be depicted as a child.

== History ==
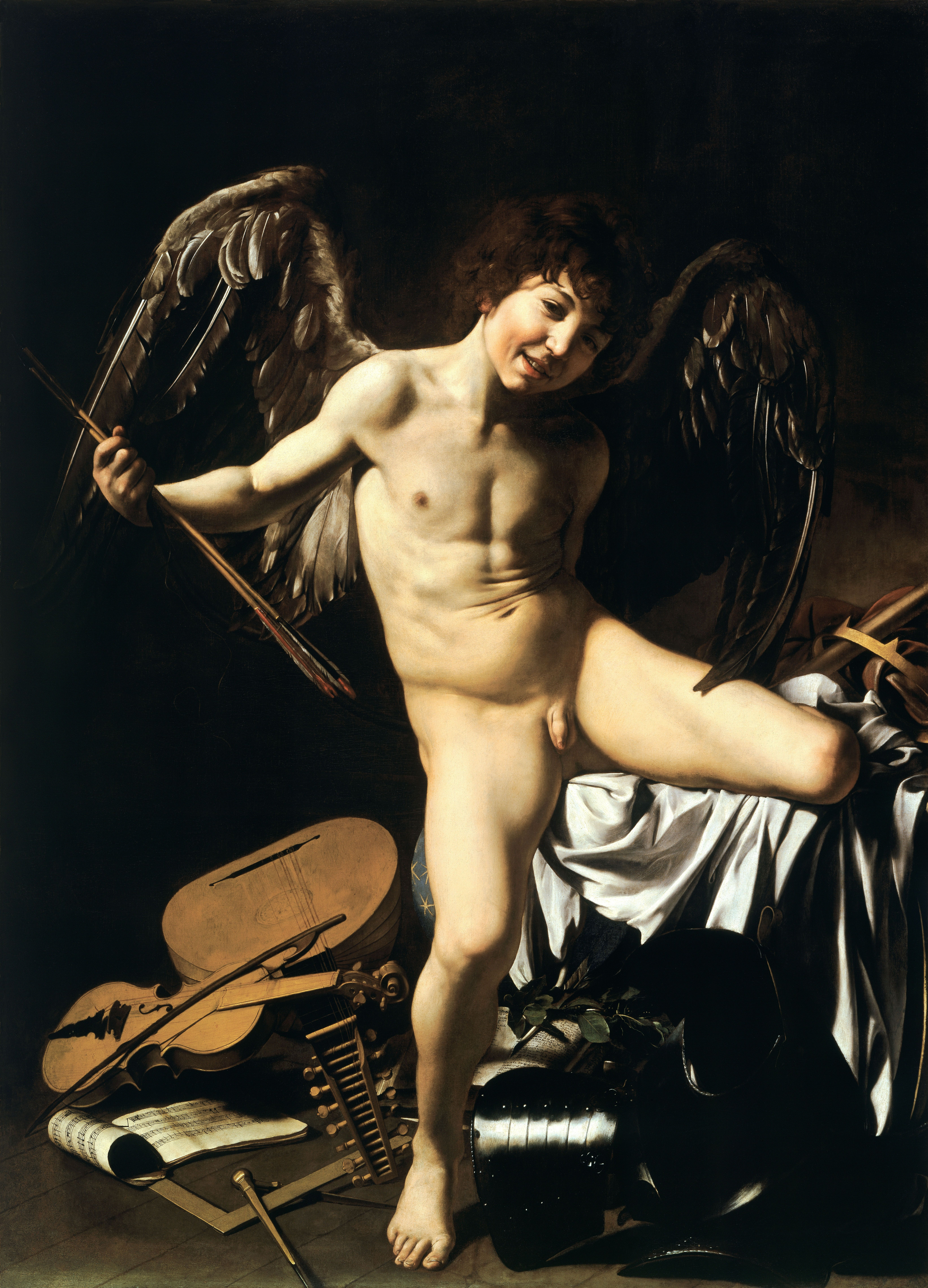
Amor Vincit Omnia (Love Victorious) - Caravaggio, 1602

Since Baglione had been trained by Francesco Morelli, a Tuscan artist, most of his artwork resembled Morelli’s style. However, in approximately the beginning of 1600, Baglione was introduced to Caravaggio’s style, and like many other artists at the time, he admired the artist’s work. Thus leading Baglione into participating in the Caravaggesque era, where many artists derived elements of Caravaggio’s work into their own. This includes Divine Love Conquering Earthly Love, which Baglione had created at the time as competition against Caravaggio’s work Love Victorious and Orazio Gentileschi's, St. Michael Archangel. Baglione incorporated some elements of Caravaggio’s into his work in order to surpass him. However, this displeased Caravaggio and resulted in Caravaggio slandering Baglione’s work.

Baglione unveiled his Resurrection altarpiece for the Church of the Gesù on East Sunday of 1603. Shortly after, word started circulating in Rome that Caravaggio and his cronies, Orazio Longhi, Filippo Trisegni, and Orazio Gentileschi, were disparaging Baglione’s artistic abilities.

These insults lead into a libel lawsuit in the same year, 1603. During the trial, Caravaggio claimed, "I don't know any painter who thinks Giovanni Baglione is a good painter." For centuries, this exact claim tainted Baglione’s reputation and the way his artwork was judged.

Baglione stated that the attackers were only insulting him because they were jealous that he had been the one to receive the commission. More generally because his works were much better than Caravaggio’s by stating that the works were, "held in higher esteem than theirs.” During the trial, when Caravaggio was being interrogated, scholars claim that he still proceeded to add to the insults. Smith O’Neil claims that with this trial, what Baglione was demonstrating is a vendetta towards Caravaggio and to also prove his virtù.

Towards the end of 1604, the trial had already ended and Baglione’s Caravaggesque era as well.

== Symbolism ==
The figure in the armor is a depiction of Eros, who is suspected to be representing Divine Love. In the scene, he is interrupting a tryst between the naked boy which is a representation of Cupid, in the bottom right corner, and the Devil, in the bottom left. Cupid is also said to be a symbolism of the victory of power and fame.

It is believed that the devil is a portrait of Caravaggio. It also includes satirical criticism to both Caravaggio’s art and his moral scruples; it is also a visual representation of sodomy.

== Provenance ==
The painting was done for Vincenzo Giustiniani’s brother, the Cardinal Benedetto Giustiniani, however, the reason as to why, is unknown. In return, Baglione received a gold chain from Giustiniani.

== Other names ==
- Divine Love Overcoming Earthly Love
- Sacred and Profane Love
- Divine Love Overcoming the World, the Flesh and the Devil
- Divine Love Overcoming the World
