= Anxious-preoccupied attachment =

Interpersonal attachment style

Anxious-preoccupied attachment has been linked to various psychological and interpersonal difficulties. For example, research has suggested that anxious-preoccupied attachment may mediate the relationship between childhood emotional abuse and borderline personality disorder.

== Characteristics ==
Individuals with an anxious-preoccupied attachment style are characterized by a strong desire for closeness and intimacy in their relationships, but they often experience high levels of anxiety and uncertainty about the availability and responsiveness of their attachment figures. This attachment style is associated with a negative model of the self and a positive model of others, leading to a preoccupation with relationships and a fear of abandonment.

Anxious-preoccupied individuals tend to have a heightened sensitivity to emotional cues and a tendency to perceive more pain intensity and unpleasantness in others. This may be due to the projection of their own "actual-self" traits onto their perception of others. They tend to be more concerned about reaching their therapeutic goals and report less emotional relief than others after crying in therapy, especially when the relationship with their therapist is not strong.

Individuals with this attachment style tend to have a negative self-view and a vacillating or split view of others, which can contribute to interpersonal dysfunction.

Anxious-preoccupied individuals have more opportunities to reflect on their emotions, leading to a heightened ability to understand and express their feelings. They may rely on self-silencing strategies and restrict the expression of negative emotions, particularly in the context of close relationships.

== Causes ==
The anxious-preoccupied attachment style has been associated with a heightened vigilance towards emotionally significant social cues, as evidenced by increased activation in the amygdala during social appraisal tasks. This may contribute to the tendency to be overly concerned about the availability and responsiveness of attachment figures.

== Research ==
Parenting research has shown that preoccupied parents tend to display more hostile and less affectionate parenting attitudes compared to securely attached parents.

In terms of age differences, studies have found that older adults tend to have lower levels of preoccupied attachment compared to younger adults.
