= Intrusive thought =

Unwelcome involuntary thought, image or idea

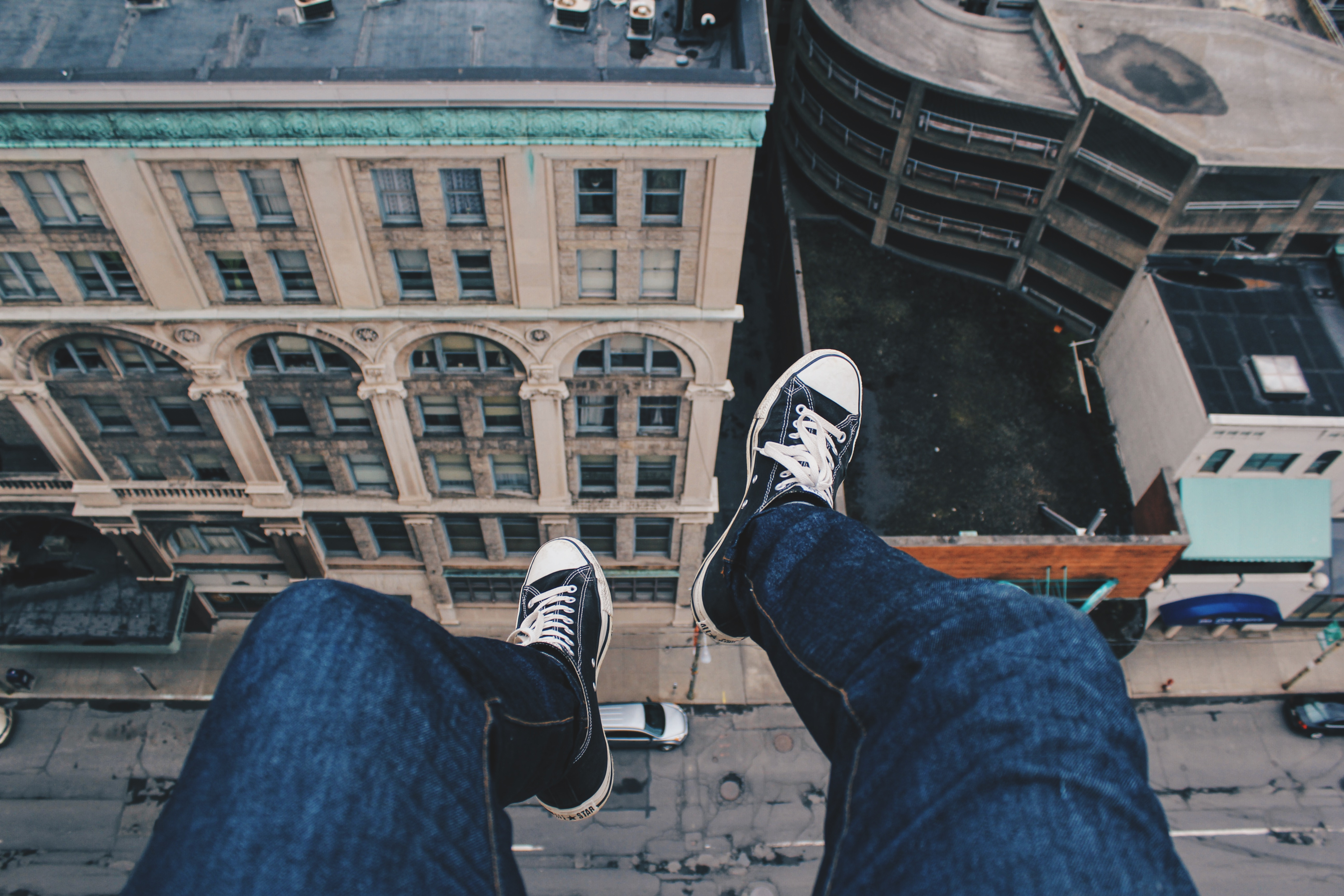
- The high place phenomenon is a common intrusive thought when present in a high place.
- Specialty: Psychiatry, clinical psychology

An intrusive thought is an unwelcome, involuntary thought, image, or unpleasant idea that may become an obsession, is upsetting or distressing, and can feel difficult to manage or eliminate. When such thoughts are paired with obsessive–compulsive disorder (OCD), Tourette syndrome (TS), depression, autism, body dysmorphic disorder (BDD), and sometimes attention deficit hyperactivity disorder (ADHD), the thoughts may become paralyzing, anxiety-provoking, or persistent. Intrusive thoughts may also be associated with episodic memory, unwanted worries or memories from OCD, post-traumatic stress disorder (PTSD), other anxiety disorders, eating disorders, or psychosis. Intrusive thoughts, urges, and images are of inappropriate things at inappropriate times, and generally have aggressive or sexual themes.

== Description ==
=== General ===
Many people experience the type of negative and uncomfortable thoughts that people with more intrusive thoughts experience, but most can readily dismiss them. For most people, intrusive thoughts are a "fleeting annoyance". Psychologist Stanley Rachman presented a questionnaire to healthy college students and found that virtually all said they had these thoughts from time to time, including thoughts of sexual violence, sexual punishment, "unnatural" sex acts, painful sexual practices, blasphemous or obscene images, thoughts of harming elderly people or someone close to them, violence against animals or towards children, and impulsive or abusive outbursts or utterances. Such thoughts are universal among humans, and have "almost certainly always been a part of the human condition".

When intrusive thoughts occur with obsessive–compulsive disorder (OCD), patients are less able to ignore the unpleasant thoughts and may pay undue attention to them, causing the thoughts to become more frequent and distressing. Attempting to suppress intrusive thoughts often causes these same thoughts to become more intense and persistent. The thoughts may become obsessions that are paralyzing, severe, and constantly present, and they may involve topics such as violence, sex, or blasphemy. Unlike normal intrusive thoughts experienced by many people, intrusive thoughts associated with OCD may be anxiety-provoking, irrepressible, and persistent.

How people react to intrusive thoughts may determine whether these thoughts will become severe, turn into obsessions, or require treatment. Intrusive thoughts can occur with or without compulsions. Carrying out the compulsion reduces the anxiety, but each recurrence strengthens the urge to perform the compulsion, reinforcing the intrusive thoughts. According to Lee Baer, suppressing the thoughts only makes them stronger, and recognizing that bad thoughts do not signify that one is truly evil is one of the steps to overcoming them. There is evidence of the benefit of acceptance as an alternative to the suppression of intrusive thoughts. In one particular study, those instructed to suppress intrusive thoughts experienced more distress after suppression, while patients instructed to accept the bad thoughts experienced decreased discomfort. These results may be related to underlying cognitive processes involved in OCD. However, accepting the thoughts can be more difficult for persons with OCD.

The possibility that most patients with intrusive thoughts will ever act on those thoughts is low. Patients who are experiencing intense guilt, anxiety, shame, and are upset over these thoughts are very different from those who actually act on them. Patients who are not troubled or shamed by their thoughts, do not find them distasteful, or who have actually taken action, might have a more serious condition such as psychosis, or potentially other criminal behaviors that need to be ruled out. According to Lee Baer, a patient should be concerned that intrusive thoughts are dangerous if the person does not feel upset by the thoughts, or rather finds them pleasurable; has ever acted on their violent or sexual thoughts and urges; hears voices, or sees things that others do not see; or feels uncontrollably irresistible anger, which they believe they can no longer suppress.

=== Aggressive thoughts ===
Intrusive thoughts may involve violent or destructive obsessions about hurting others or themselves. They can be related to primarily obsessional obsessive–compulsive disorder. These thoughts can include harming a child; jumping from a bridge, mountain, or the top of a tall building; urges to jump in front of a train or automobile; and urges to push another in front of a train or automobile. Rachman's survey of healthy college students found that virtually all of them had intrusive thoughts from time to time, including:

- causing harm to elderly people
- imagining or wishing harm upon someone close to oneself
- impulses to violently attack, hit, harm or kill a person, small child, or animal
- impulses to shout at or abuse someone, or attack and violently punish someone, or say something rude, inappropriate, nasty, or violent to someone.

These thoughts are part of the human condition and do not ruin the life of the person experiencing it. Treatment is available when the thoughts are associated with OCD and become persistent, severe, or distressing.

One example of an aggressive intrusive thought is the high place phenomenon, the sudden urge to jump from a high place. A 2011 study assessed the prevalence of this phenomenon among US college students; it found that even among those participants with no history of suicidal ideation, over 50% had experienced an urge to jump or imagined themselves jumping from a high place at least once. A 2020 study carried out in Germany reported similar results. The phenomenon is more commonly experienced by individuals with a high level of anxiety sensitivity, and may be caused by the conscious mind's misinterpretation of an instinctive safety signal.

=== Sexual thoughts ===
Sexual obsession involves intrusive thoughts or images of "kissing, touching, fondling, oral sex, anal sex, intercourse, and rape" with "strangers, acquaintances, parents, children, family members, friends, coworkers, animals, and religious figures", involving "heterosexual or homosexual content" with persons of any age.

Common sexual themes for intrusive thoughts for men involve:

- Having sex in a public place
- Having people come in contact with oneself in a state of nakedness
- Engaging in a sexual act with someone who is unacceptable to oneself because they are in a position of authority.

Common sexual intrusive thoughts for women are:

- Having sex in a public place
- Engaging in a sexual act with someone who is unacceptable to oneself because they are in a position of authority.
- Being sexually victimized.

Like other unwanted intrusive thoughts or images, most people have some inappropriate sexual thoughts at times, but people with OCD may attach significance to the unwanted sexual thoughts, generating anxiety and distress. The doubt that accompanies OCD leads to uncertainty regarding whether one might act on the intrusive thoughts, resulting in self-criticism or loathing.

One of the more common sexual intrusive thoughts occurs when an obsessive person doubts their sexual identity. As in the case of most sexual obsessions, individuals may feel shame and live in isolation, finding it hard to discuss their fears, doubts, and concerns about their sexual identity.

A person experiencing sexual intrusive thoughts may feel shame, "embarrassment, guilt, distress, torment, fear of acting on the thought or perceived impulse, and doubt about whether they have already acted in such a way". Depression may be a result of the self-loathing that can occur, depending on how much the OCD interferes with daily functioning or causes distress. Their concern over these thoughts may cause them to scrutinize their bodies to determine if the thoughts result in feelings of arousal. However, focusing their attention on any part of the body can result in feelings in that body part, hence doing so may decrease confidence and increase fear about acting on the urges. Part of the treatment of sexual intrusive thoughts involves therapy to help them accept intrusive thoughts and stop trying to reassure themselves by checking their bodies. This arousal within the body parts is due to conditioned physiological responses in the brain, which do not respond to the subject of the sexual intrusive thought but rather to the fact that a sexual thought is occurring at all and thus engage an automatic response. Research indicates that the correlation between psychological arousal and physiological arousal is 0.66 in men and 0.26 in women. This means that an arousal response does not necessarily indicate that the person desires what they are thinking about. However, rational thinking processes attempt to explain this reaction and OCD causes people to attribute false meaning and importance to these physiological reactions in an attempt to make sense of them. People can also experience heightened anxiety caused by forbidden images or simply by discussing the matter which can then also cause physiological arousal, such as sweating, increased heart rate and some degree of tumescence or lubrication. This is often misinterpreted by the individual as an indication of desire or intent, when it is in fact not.

=== Religious thoughts ===
Blasphemous thoughts are a common component of OCD, documented throughout history; notable religious figures such as Martin Luther and Ignatius of Loyola were known to be tormented by intrusive, blasphemous or religious thoughts and urges. Martin Luther had urges to curse God and Jesus, and was obsessed with images of "the Devil's behind". St. Ignatius had numerous obsessions, including the fear of stepping on pieces of straw forming a cross, fearing that it showed disrespect to Christ. A study of 50 patients with a primary diagnosis of obsessive–compulsive disorder found that 40% had religious and blasphemous thoughts and doubts—a higher, but not statistically significantly different number than the 38% who had the obsessional thoughts related to dirt and contamination more commonly associated with OCD. One study suggests that the content of intrusive thoughts may vary depending on culture, and that blasphemous thoughts may be more common in men than in women.

According to Fred Penzel, a New York psychologist, some common religious obsessions and intrusive thoughts are:

- sexual thoughts about God, saints, and religious figures
- bad thoughts or images during prayer or meditation
- thoughts of being possessed
- fears of sinning or breaking a religious law or performing a ritual incorrectly
- fears of omitting prayers or reciting them incorrectly
- repetitive and intrusive blasphemous thoughts
- urges or impulses to say blasphemous words or commit blasphemous acts during religious services.

Suffering may be greater and treatment more complicated when intrusive thoughts involve religious implications; patients may believe the thoughts are inspired by Satan, and may fear punishment from God or have magnified shame because they perceive themselves as sinful. Symptoms can be more distressing for individuals with strong religious convictions or beliefs.

Baer believes that blasphemous thoughts are more common in Catholics and evangelical Protestants than in other religions, whereas Jews or Muslims tend to have obsessions related more to complying with the laws and rituals of their faith, and performing the rituals perfectly. He hypothesizes that this is because what is considered inappropriate varies among cultures and religions, and intrusive thoughts torment their sufferers with whatever is considered most inappropriate in the surrounding culture.

== Age factors ==
Adults under the age of 40 seem to be the most affected by intrusive thoughts. Individuals in this age range tend to be less experienced at coping with these thoughts, and the stress and negative effect induced by them. Younger adults also tend to have stressors specific to that period of life that can be particularly challenging especially in the face of intrusive thoughts. Although, when introduced with an intrusive thought, both age groups immediately attempt to reduce the recurrence of these thoughts.

Those in middle adulthood (ages 55–65) have the highest prevalence of OCD and therefore seem to be the most susceptible to the anxiety and negative emotions associated with intrusive thoughts. Middle adults are in a unique position because they have to struggle with both the stressors of early and late adulthood. They may be more vulnerable to intrusive thought because they have more topics to relate to. Even with this being the case, middle adults are still better at coping with intrusive thoughts than early adults, although processing an intrusive thought takes middle adults longer. Older adults tend to see the intrusive thought more as a cognitive failure rather than a moral failure in opposition to young adults. They have a harder time suppressing the intrusive thoughts than young adults causing them to experience higher stress levels when dealing with these thoughts.

Intrusive thoughts appear to occur at the same rate across the lifespan; however, older adults seem to be less negatively affected than younger adults. Older adults have more experience in ignoring or suppressing strong negative reactions to stress.

== Associated conditions ==
Intrusive thoughts are associated with OCD or OCPD, but may also occur with other conditions such as post-traumatic stress disorder, clinical depression, postpartum depression, generalized anxiety disorder, and anxiety. One of these conditions is almost always present in people whose intrusive thoughts reach a clinical level of severity. A large study published in 2005 found that aggressive, sexual, and religious obsessions were broadly associated with comorbid anxiety disorders and depression.

=== Post-traumatic stress disorder ===
The key difference between OCD and post-traumatic stress disorder (PTSD) is that the intrusive thoughts of people with PTSD are of content relating to traumatic events that actually happened to them, whereas people with OCD have thoughts of imagined catastrophes. PTSD patients with intrusive thoughts have to sort out violent, sexual, or blasphemous thoughts from memories of traumatic experiences. When patients with intrusive thoughts do not respond to treatment, physicians may suspect past physical, emotional, or sexual abuse. If a person who has experienced trauma practices looks for the positive outcomes, it is suggested they will experience less depression and higher self well-being. While a person may experience less depression for benefit finding, they may also experience an increased amount of intrusive and/or avoidant thoughts.

One study looking at women with PTSD found that intrusive thoughts were more persistent when the individual tried to cope by using avoidance-based thought regulation strategies. Their findings further support that not all coping strategies are helpful in diminishing the frequency of intrusive thoughts.

=== Depression ===
People who are clinically depressed may experience intrusive thoughts more intensely and view them as evidence that they are worthless or sinful people. The suicidal thoughts that are common in depression must be distinguished from intrusive thoughts, because suicidal thoughts—unlike harmless sexual, aggressive, or religious thoughts—can be dangerous.

Non-depressed individuals have been shown to have a higher activation in the dorsolateral prefrontal cortex while attempting to suppress intrusive thoughts. The dorsolateral prefrontal cortex is the area of the brain that primarily functions in cognition, working memory, and planning. This activation decreases in people at risk of or currently diagnosed with depression. When the intrusive thoughts re-emerge, non-depressed individuals also show higher activation levels in the anterior cingulate cortices, which functions in error detection, motivation, and emotional regulation, than their depressed counterparts.

Roughly 60% of depressed individuals report experiencing bodily, visual, or auditory perceptions along with their intrusive thoughts. There is a correlation with experiencing those sensations with intrusive thoughts and more intense depressive symptoms as well as the need for heavier treatment.

=== Postpartum depression and OCD ===
Unwanted thoughts by mothers about harming infants are common in postpartum depression. A 1999 study of 65 women with postpartum major depression by Katherine Wisner et al. found the most frequent aggressive thought for women with postpartum depression was causing harm to their newborn infants. A study of 85 new parents found that 89% experienced intrusive images, for example, of the baby suffocating, having an accident, being harmed, or being kidnapped.

Some women may develop symptoms of OCD during pregnancy or the postpartum period. Postpartum OCD occurs mainly in women who may already have OCD, perhaps in a mild or undiagnosed form. Postpartum depression and OCD may be comorbid (often occurring together). And though physicians may focus more on the depressive symptoms, one study found that obsessive thoughts did accompany postpartum depression in 57% of new mothers.

Wisner found common obsessions about harming babies in mothers experiencing postpartum depression include images of the baby lying dead in a casket or being eaten by sharks; stabbing the baby; throwing the baby down the stairs; or drowning or burning the baby (as by submerging it in the bathtub in the former case or throwing it in the fire or putting it in the microwave in the latter). Baer estimates that up to 200,000 new mothers with postpartum depression each year may develop these obsessional thoughts about their babies; and because they may be reluctant to share these thoughts with a physician or family member, or suffer in silence out of fear they could be "crazy", their depression can worsen.

Intrusive fears of harming immediate children can last longer than the postpartum period. A study of 100 clinically depressed women found that 41% had obsessive fears that they might harm their child, and some were afraid to care for their children. Among non-depressed mothers, the study found 7% had thoughts of harming their child—a rate that yields an additional 280,000 non-depressed mothers in the United States with intrusive thoughts about harming their children.

== Treatment ==
Treatment for intrusive thoughts is similar to treatment for OCD. Exposure and response prevention therapy—also referred to as habituation or desensitization—is useful in treating intrusive thoughts. Mild cases can also be treated with cognitive behavioral therapy, which helps patients identify and manage the unwanted thoughts.

=== Exposure therapy ===
Exposure therapy is the treatment of choice for intrusive thoughts. According to Deborah Osgood-Hynes, Psy.D. Director of Psychological Services and Training at the MGH/McLean OCD Institute, "In order to reduce a fear, you have to face a fear. This is true of all types of anxiety and fear reactions, not just OCD." Because it is uncomfortable to experience bad thoughts and urges, shame, doubt or fear, the initial reaction is usually to do something to make the feelings diminish. By engaging in a ritual or compulsion to diminish the anxiety or bad feeling, the action is strengthened via a process called negative reinforcement—the mind learns that the way to avoid the bad feeling is by engaging in a ritual or compulsions. When OCD becomes severe, this leads to more interference in life and continues the frequency and severity of the thoughts the person sought to avoid.

Exposure therapy (or exposure and response prevention) is the practice of staying in an anxiety-provoking or feared situation until the distress or anxiety diminishes. The goal is to reduce the fear reaction, learning to not react to the bad thoughts. This is the most effective way to reduce the frequency and severity of the intrusive thoughts. The goal is to be able to "expose yourself to the thing that most triggers your fear or discomfort for one to two hours at a time, without leaving the situation, or doing anything else to distract or comfort you." Exposure therapy will not eliminate intrusive thoughts—everyone has bad thoughts—but most patients find that it can decrease their thoughts sufficiently that intrusive thoughts no longer interfere with their lives.

=== Cognitive behavioral therapy ===
Cognitive behavioral therapy (CBT) is a newer therapy than exposure therapy, available for those unable or unwilling to undergo exposure therapy. Cognitive therapy has been shown to be useful in reducing intrusive thoughts, but developing a conceptualization of the obsessions and compulsions with the patient is important. One of the strategies sometimes used in Cognitive Behavioral Theory is mindfulness exercises. These include practices such as being aware of the thoughts, accepting the thoughts without judgement for them, and "being larger than your thoughts."

=== Medication ===
Antidepressants or antipsychotic medications may be used for more severe cases if intrusive thoughts do not respond to cognitive behavioral or exposure therapy alone. Whether the cause of intrusive thoughts is OCD, depression, or post-traumatic stress disorder, the selective serotonin reuptake inhibitor (SSRI) drugs (a class of antidepressants) are the most commonly prescribed. Intrusive thoughts may occur in persons with Tourette syndrome (TS) who also have OCD; the obsessions in TS-related OCD are thought to respond to SSRI drugs as well.

Antidepressants that have been shown to be effective in treating OCD include fluvoxamine (trade name (Note: Medication trade names may differ between countries. In general, this article uses North American trade names.) Luvox), fluoxetine (Prozac), sertraline (Zoloft), paroxetine (Paxil), citalopram (Celexa), and clomipramine (Anafranil). Although SSRIs are known to be effective for OCD in general, there have been fewer studies on their effectiveness for intrusive thoughts. A retrospective chart review of patients with sexual symptoms treated with SSRIs showed the greatest improvement was in those with intrusive sexual obsessions typical of OCD. A study of ten patients with religious or blasphemous obsessions found that most patients responded to treatment with fluoxetine or clomipramine. Women with postpartum depression often have anxiety as well, and may need lower starting doses of SSRIs; they may not respond fully to the medication, and may benefit from adding cognitive behavioral or response prevention therapy.

Patients with intense intrusive thoughts that do not respond to SSRIs or other antidepressants may be prescribed typical and atypical neuroleptics including risperidone (trade name Risperdal), ziprasidone (Geodon), haloperidol (Haldol), and pimozide (Orap).

Studies suggest that therapeutic doses of inositol may be useful in the treatment of obsessive thoughts.

== Epidemiology ==
A 2007 study found that 78% of a clinical sample of OCD patients had intrusive images. Most people with intrusive thoughts have not identified themselves as having OCD, because they may not have what they believe to be classic symptoms of OCD, such as handwashing. Yet, epidemiological studies suggest that intrusive thoughts are the most common kind of OCD worldwide; if people in the United States with intrusive thoughts gathered, they would form the fourth-largest city in the US, following New York City, Los Angeles, and Chicago.

The prevalence of OCD in every culture studied is at least 2% of the population, and the majority of those have obsessions, or bad thoughts, only; this results in a conservative estimate of more than 2 million affected individuals in the United States alone (as of 2000). One author estimates that one in 50 adults have OCD and about 10–20% of these have sexual obsessions. A recent study found that 25% of 293 patients with a primary diagnosis of OCD had a history of sexual obsessions.

== See also ==
- Earworm – Music or saying that sticks in the mind
- Existentialism § Angst and dread
- Internal monologue
- Shoulder angel – Plot device used for an effect in fictional works
- The Imp of the Perverse – 1845 work by Edgar Allan Poe
- Tourette syndrome – Neurodevelopmental disorder involving tics
