= Bricklayers Arms railway station =

Disused railway station in England

Bricklayers Arms
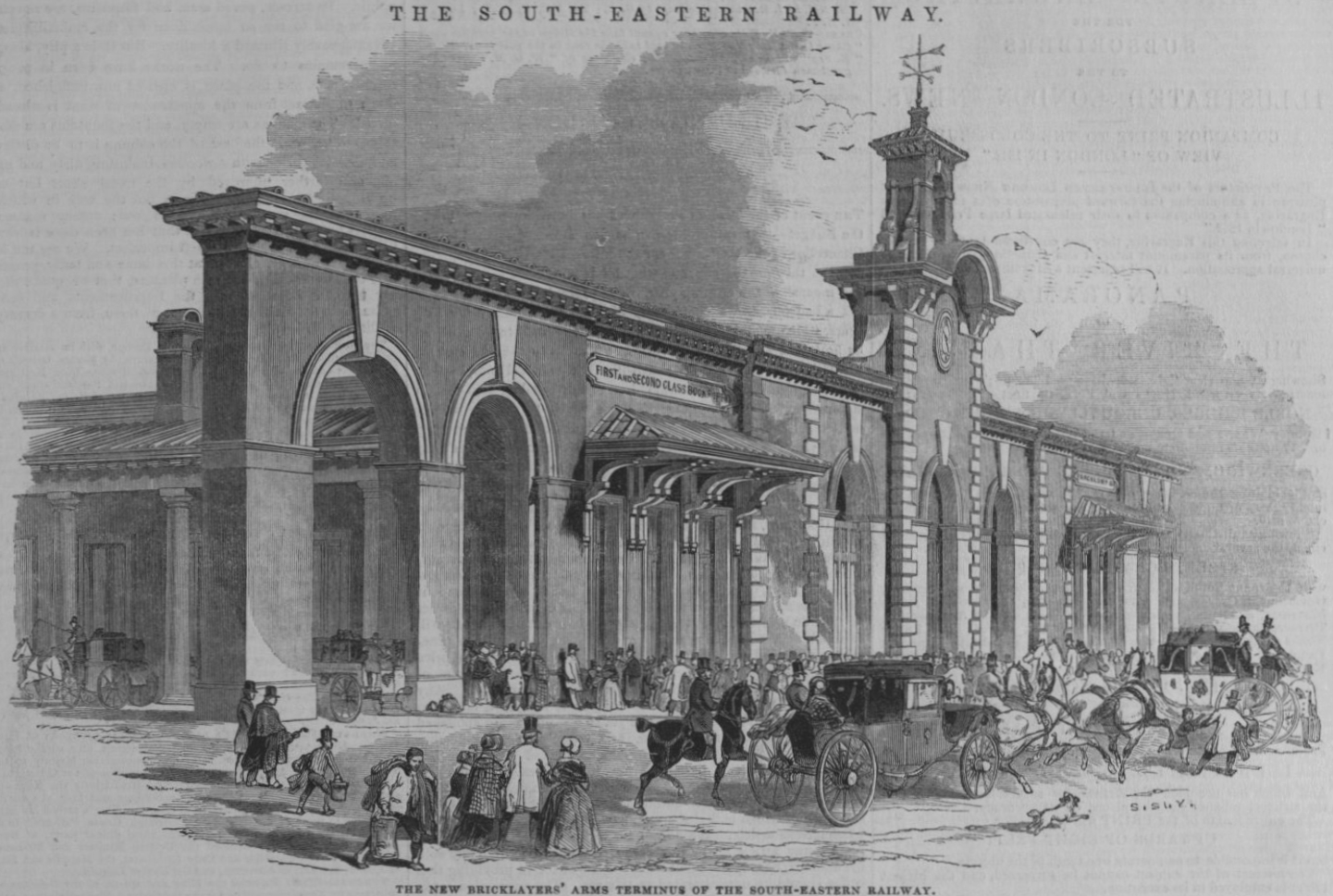
- Lewis Cubitt's passenger station, 1844
- Interactive map of Bricklayers Arms

General information
- Location: Southwark
- Local authority: Southwark
- Owner: London and Croydon Railway/South Eastern Railway

Key dates
- 1844: Opened
- 1847: Opened (Willow Walk Goods)
- 1852: Closed (Passengers)
- 1977: Closed (General Goods)
- 1981: Closed (Coal/Parcels)

Other information
- Coordinates: 51.49304°N 0.0811163°W

Bricklayers Arms was a railway station in Southwark opened by the London and Croydon Railway and the South Eastern Railway in 1844 as an alternative to the London and Greenwich Railway's terminus at London Bridge. The station was at the end of a short branch line from the main line to London Bridge and served as a passenger terminus for a few years before being converted to a goods station and engineering facility. The goods station closed in 1981.

== Bricklayers Arms branch ==
The branch line was authorised by the South Eastern Railway (Swan Street Station and Junction) Act 1843 (6 & 7 Vict. c. lxii), and was one mile and 56 chains (2.7 km) in length and was constructed in 1843–44 as a result of concerns by the South Eastern (SER) and London and Croydon (L&CR) Railways about the charges being imposed by the London and Greenwich Railway (L&GR) for the use of their terminus at London Bridge station and its approaches. The two railways constructed a new passenger terminus and goods station on the site, thereby removing the need for them to use the L&GR facilities. According to Charles Vignoles, "the making of Bricklayers Arms station was a matter of compulsion in driving the Greenwich people to reasonable terms."

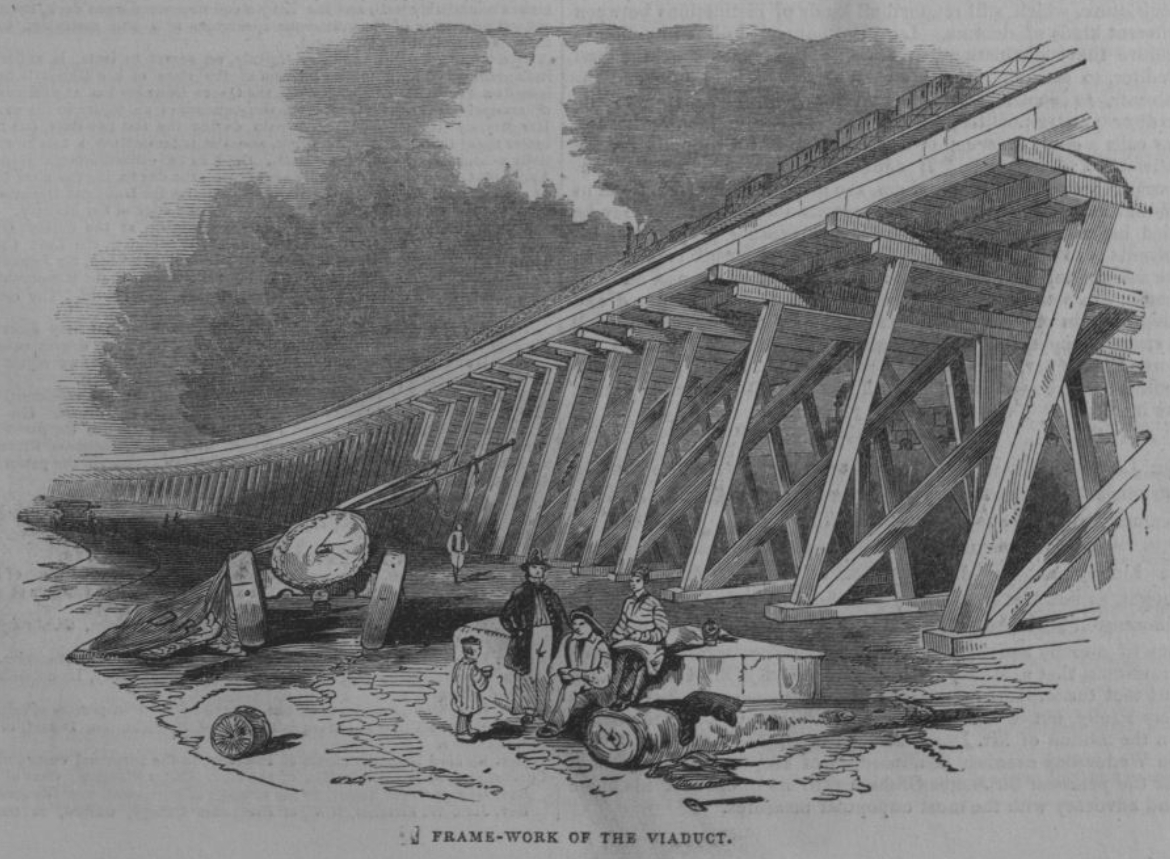
Timber viaduct leading to the branch, 1844

The viaduct at the eastern end of the Bricklayers Arms branch was originally constructed on timber trestles instead of brick arches. The junction between the branch and the main line was the first in the world to be controlled by a signal box. The signals and points were installed by Charles Hutton Gregory, and were the first to contain some elements of interlocking. A boiler explosion by a SER locomotive on 11 December 1844 caused damage to the timber viaduct and killed the driver and fireman.

Construction of the new terminus had the desired effect, and the L&GR agreed to more reasonable terms; as a result the L&CR ceased using the station in March 1845, though it retained running powers over the branch. The SER leased the L&GR from 1 January 1845 and L&CR became part of the London, Brighton and South Coast Railway (LB&SCR) on 27 February 1846. The two companies concentrated future passenger developments at London Bridge.

Plans to extend the line from Bricklayers Arms to a new SER terminus at Hungerford Bridge, closer to the centre of London, were never implemented. The railway introduced a proposal to extend the line to Waterloo Road in 1846, which was rejected by a committee of Parliament.

Under a series of agreements of 1848 and 1849, the LB&SCR sold its inherited share of the facilities to the SER in 1849, whilst retaining the right to use the branch and to construct its own 15-acre (61,000 m^{2}) goods depot on the site for an annual rent of one shilling (12d, 5p).

In the early 1890s, the SER again proposed building an extension of the branch, but this time to Charing Cross and thence to Cannon Street; this plan was deferred circa 1894, and was not later proceeded with by the South Eastern and Chatham Railway Management Committee.

== Passenger terminus ==
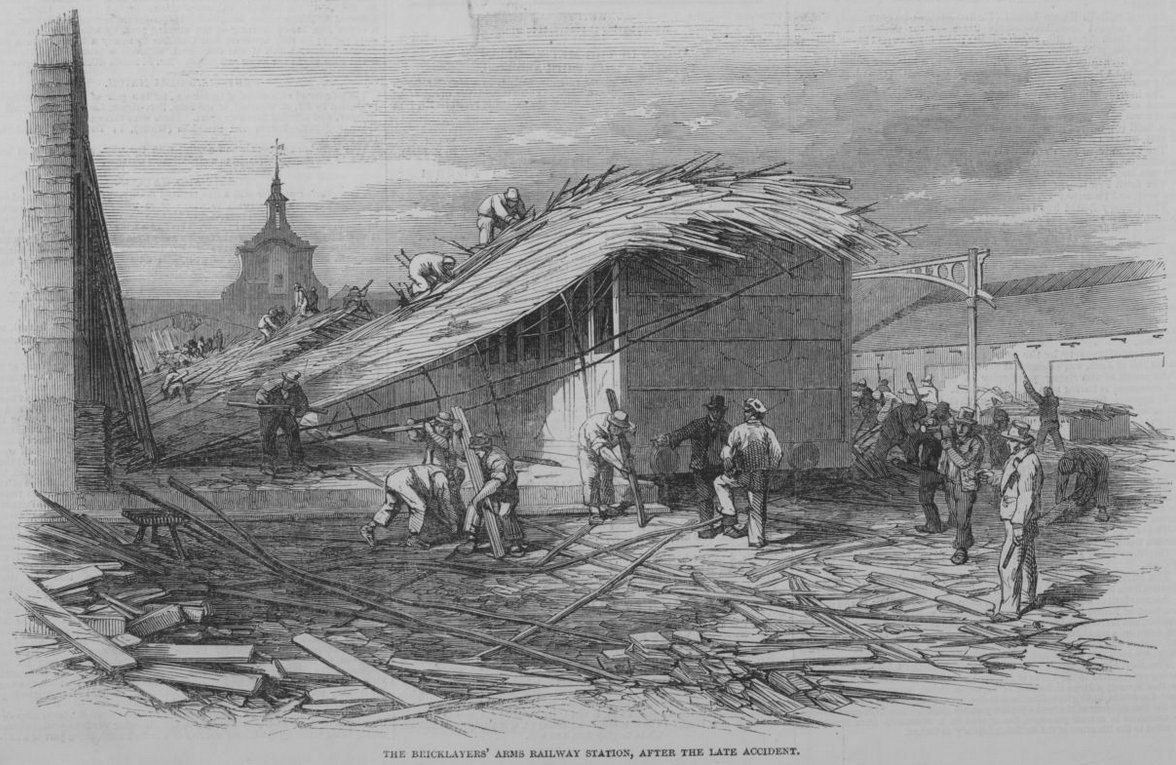
Collapsed roof at Bricklayers Arms station following the accident, 1850

The terminus building was designed by Lewis Cubitt with an imposing facade of yellow brick and stone that was topped by a bell tower with an illuminated clock and colonnades to the platforms. The design resembled his later design of King's Cross railway station, and cost £89,000. From its opening, the SER transferred all of its services to this new terminus, whilst the L&CR operated services from both termini.

The station was never commercially viable as a passenger terminus due to its location in a poor working-class neighbourhood on the Old Kent Road and its distance from the centre of London. Its raison d'etre largely disappeared after the SER took over the operation of the L&GR. A shunting accident on 21 August 1850 caused the collapse of a large part of the station roof, killing a porter and injuring 3 others. (Note: The collapse was caused by a shunting engine running into a goods wagon being manoeuvred on a turntable which pushed the wagon into a column supporting the roof, which collapsed. Few staff and no passengers were in the station at the time.) The SER closed the Bricklayers Arms terminus for passenger traffic on 1 January 1852 and transferred all of its services back to London Bridge. Thereafter, it was occasionally used for special trains, such as the Duke of Wellington's funeral train and a Royal train carrying Queen Alexandra on 3 March 1863. It was also used for passenger excursion trains from 1932 until circa 1940, and occasional enthusiasts' specials until closure of the line in 1981.

== Goods depots ==
Maps of Bricklayers Arms
& Willow Walk Goods depots

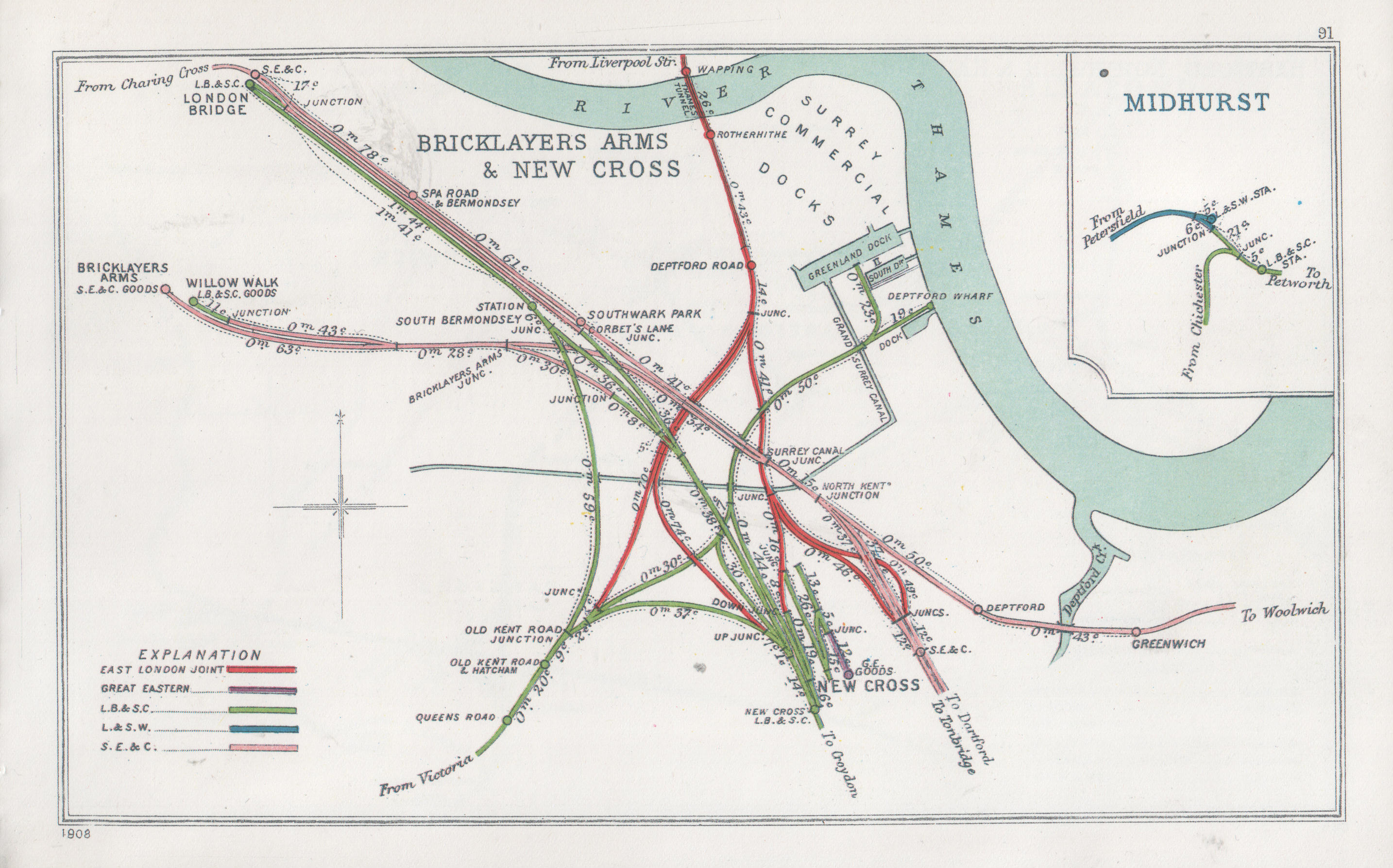
Railway Clearing House, 1908

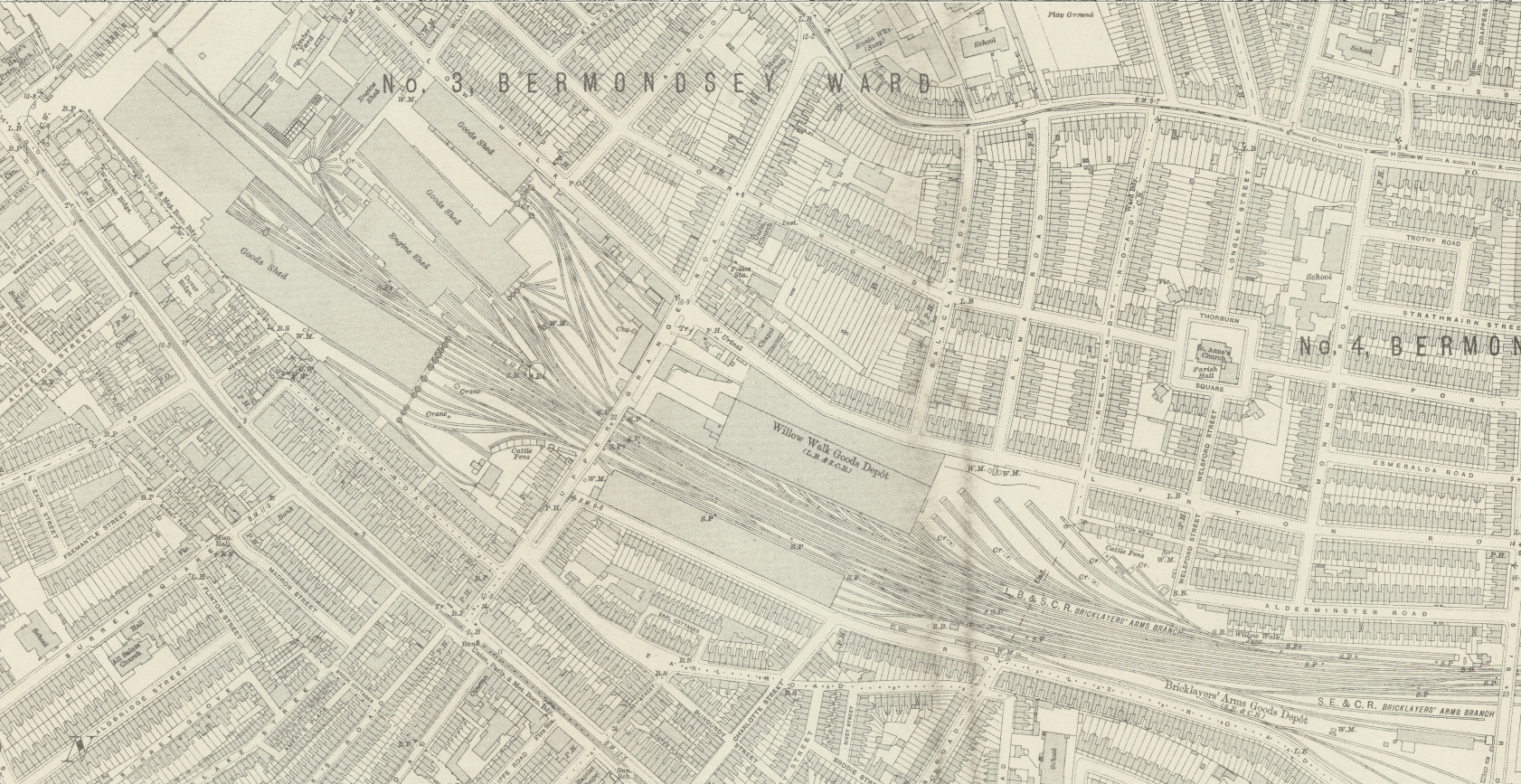
Ordnance Survey, 1916

After closure of the passenger facilities the original goods station and the surrounding site proved to be ideal for the development of the main SER goods depot in London. New sidings were laid and the former passenger station was converted into a goods station.

The LB&SCR inherited the L&CR running powers over the branch line and established their own independent goods facilities on the contiguous site at Willow Walk in July 1849. These replaced the former L&CR facilities at New Cross.

The LB&SCR facilities were enlarged in 1854 after the Brighton company entered into an agreement with the SER's rival, the London Chatham and Dover Railway to handle their goods traffic at the depot. Further extensions were built in 1865 and 1902. The Willow Walk depot was officially merged with the Bricklayers Arms depot by the Southern Railway in March 1932.

== Motive power depot and repair shop ==
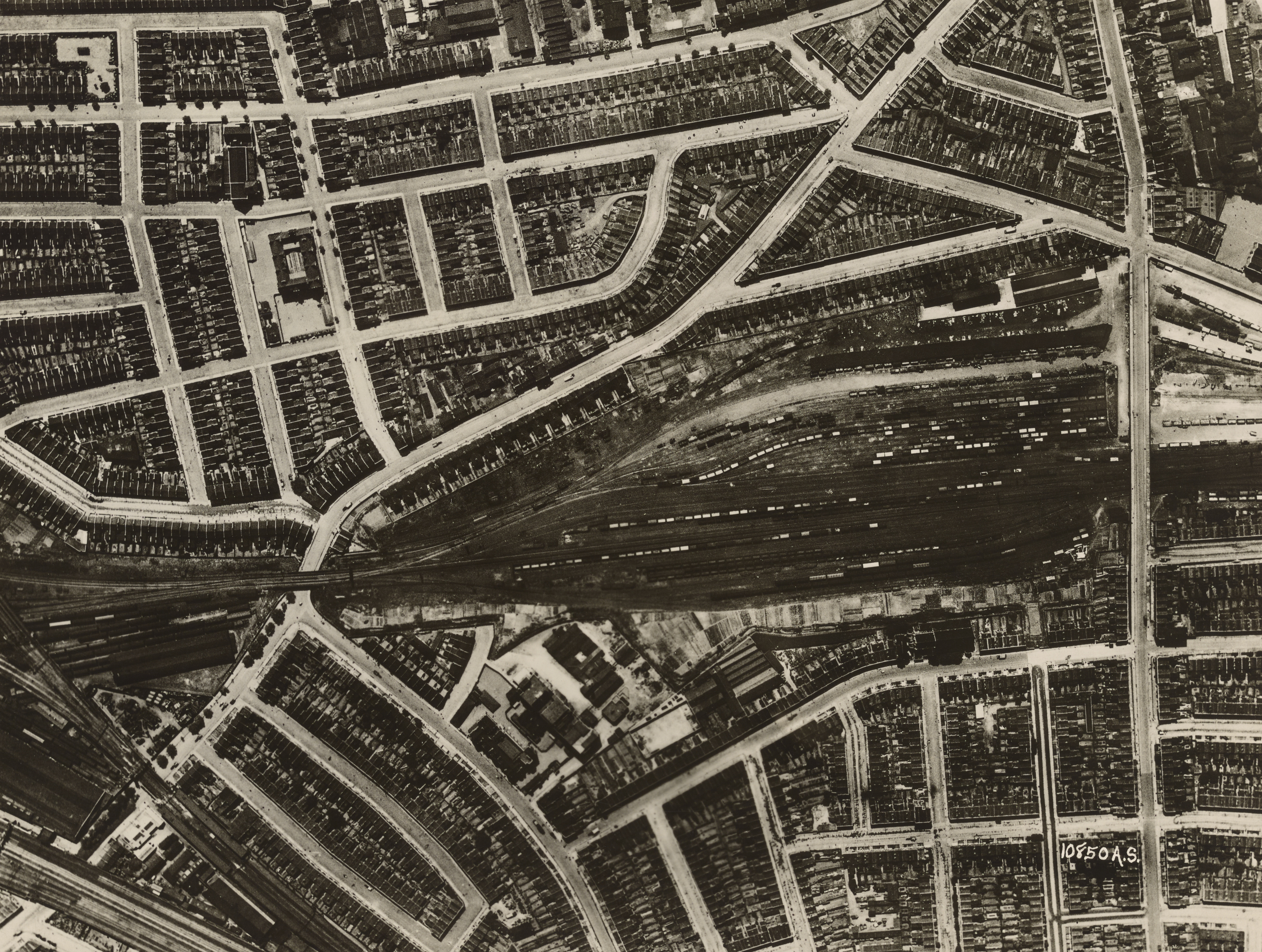
Aerial view of the yards

The SER also opened a motive power depot at the site on 1 May 1844, with a turntable large enough to turn the engine and its tender together. This rapidly grew over several buildings and became its principal locomotive depot. It was responsible for an allocation of over 100 locomotives. It operated for nearly 120 years, supplying locomotives and crews for goods and suburban passenger services, as well as the more prestigious express trains from London to the South Coast. It closed on 17 June 1962.

The other important role was to provide refuelling facilities for visiting trains that had worked services into London. Once uncoupled from their coaches, locomotives from Charing Cross, Cannon Street and London Bridge stations usually ran tender-first down to the Bricklayers Arms' shed to be turned round on the large turntable, rewatered and recoaled. Once this was completed, they again ran tender-first back to the terminus to rejoin their train for the return journey out of London. Access to and from the Bricklayers Arms' complex on the SER side was via a branch line down a long slope which dropped below the viaducts to either side of it.

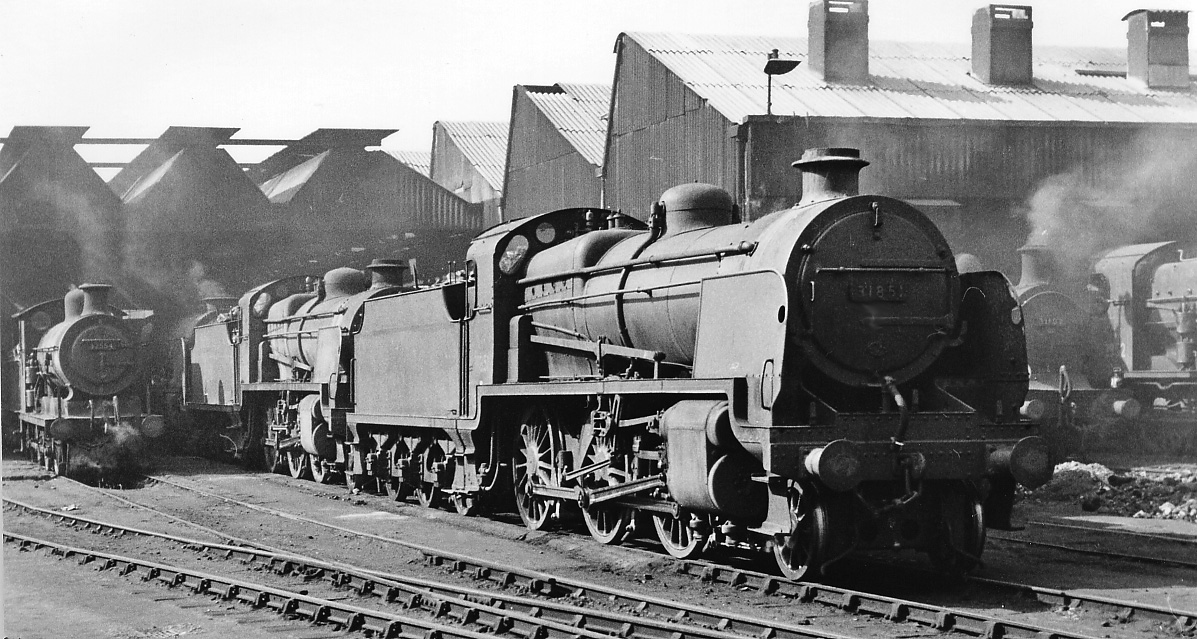
The main engine shed in 1959

The original two-road (two tracks) engine shed lasted from 1844 until 1869. It was supplemented by a nearby four-road shed in 1847, which in turn was enlarged by an adjoining four-road shed in 1865. After 1869 these two sheds became known as the Old Shed and survived until closure. A fourth shed with six roads was opened in 1869, which was known as the New Shed. This was badly damaged during bombing in the Second World War when it lost its roof, and was never repaired. A fifth engine shed with four roads was converted from a carriage shed in 1902 and was known as St Patrick's Shed. This lasted until closure.

Following the grouping of Britain's railways in 1923, the Southern Railway modernised the depot and in 1934 built a locomotive repair shop. However the facility was badly damaged by enemy action during the Second World War and was never fully repaired afterwards. When British Rail converted from steam to diesel traction in the 1960s the shed became surplus to requirements and closed down, but the goods sidings continued in use until 1981, when the whole complex was sold to developers.

The wheel drop from the repair shop and the turntable from the shed were rescued for the Watercress Line, in Hampshire. The former has been installed at Ropley shed and the latter has been exchanged (summer 2010) for a tank engine.

== Current use of the site ==
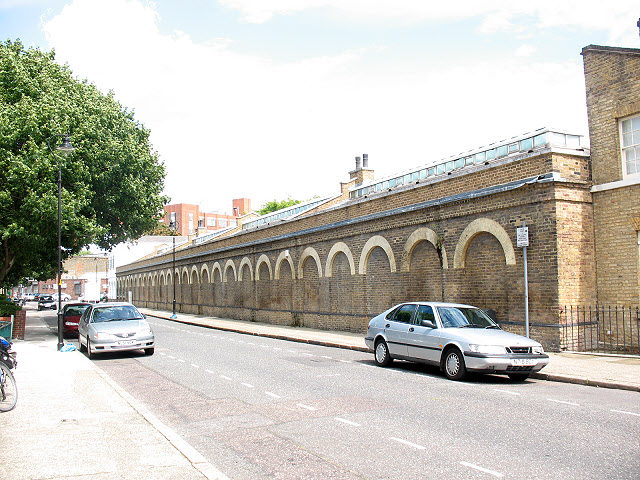
Former stables building,
Page's Walk

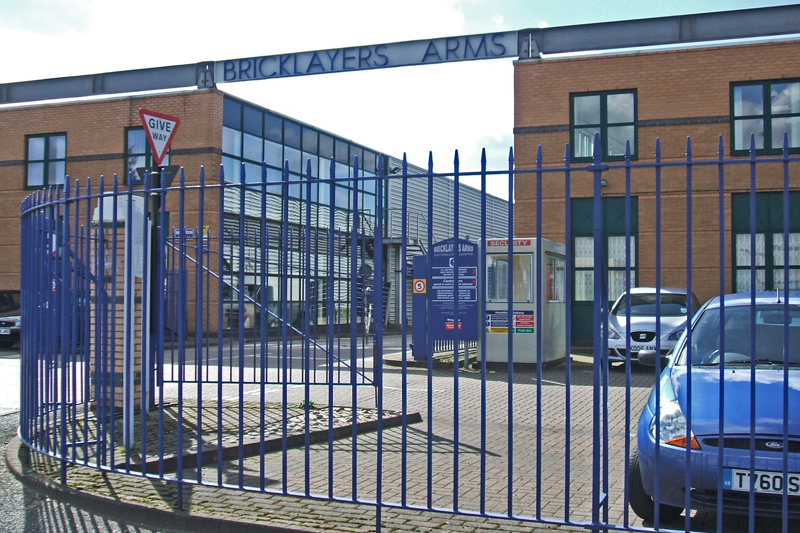
Bricklayers Arms Distribution Centre, Mandela Way

Following the closure of the depot and the branch line, the land occupied has been redeveloped. The area occupied by the goods sidings is now covered by housing and the site of the depot sheds has become a trading estate served by a new road, Mandela Way. A number of railway related buildings remain on the western perimeter of the site including former stables buildings at Pages Walk. Other remnants are parts of the perimeter walls along Willow Walk, Rolls Road and Lynton Road, the St James' Road bridge over the access route from South Bermondsey and the stables block at Caitlin Street.

== Notes and references ==
=== Bibliography ===
- Bonavia, Michael R. (1987). The history of the Southern Railway. London: Unwin Hyman. ISBN 0-04-385107-X.
- Brown, Joe (2015) [2006]. London Railway Atlas (4th ed.). Ian Allan. ISBN 978-0-7110-3819-6.
- Dendy Marshall, C.F. (1963). A history of the Southern Railway vol.1 revised by R. W. Kidner. London: Ian Allan.
- Gray, Adrian (1977). The London and Brighton line 1841-1977. Oakwood Press.
- Griffiths, Roger; Smith, Paul (1999). The directory of British engine sheds: 1 Southern England, the Midlands, East Anglia and Wales. Oxford Publishing Co.
- Hawkins, Chris; Reeve, George (1979). An historical survey of Southern sheds. Oxford Publishing Co.
- Nock, O.S. (1961). The South Eastern and Chatham Railway. London: Ian Allan.
- Pasley, C.W. (11 December 1844). Accident Returns: Extract for the Accident at Bricklayers Arms on 11th December 1844. Board of Trade.
- Sekon, G.A. (1895). History of the South Eastern Railway. London: Economic Printing and Publishing Co.
- Turner, J.T. Howard (1977). London Brighton and South Coast Railway 1. Origins and formation. London: Batsford. ISBN 0-7134-0275-X.
- Turner, J.T. Howard (1978). London Brighton and South Coast Railway 2. Establishment and Growth. London: Batsford. ISBN 0-7134-1198-8.
- Turner, J.T. Howard (1979). London Brighton and South Coast Railway 3. Completion and Maturity. London: Batsford. ISBN 0-7134-1389-1.
