= Kapel-Avezaath =

- Village
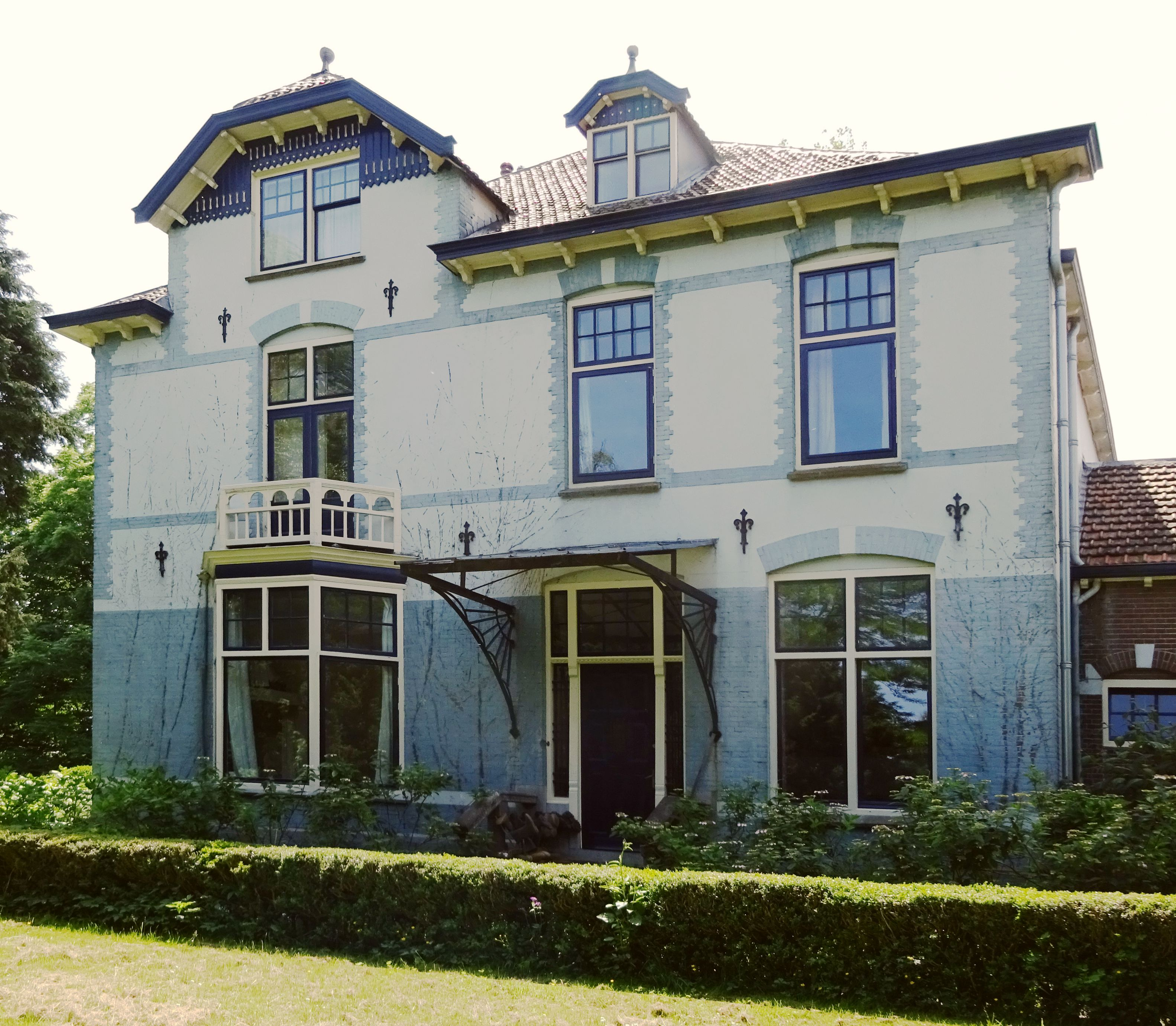
- Villa Thedingsweert

- Location in the Netherlands Kapel-Avezaath (Netherlands)
- Coordinates: 51°52′49″N 5°22′45″E
- Country: Netherlands
- Province: Gelderland
- Municipality: Tiel; Buren

Area
  - Total: 5.89 km^{2} (2.27 sq mi)
- Elevation: 5 m (16 ft)

Population (2021)
  - Total: 915
  - Density: 155/km^{2} (402/sq mi)
- Time zone: UTC+1 (CET)
  - Summer (DST): UTC+2 (CEST)
- Postal code: 4013 & 4016
- Dialing code: 0344

Kapel-Avezaath is a village in the Dutch province of Gelderland. It is a part of the municipality of Tiel, and lies about 3 km west of Tiel.

A few houses in the municipality of Buren are also part of Kapel-Avezaath.

== History ==
It was first mentioned in 1440 as "voor de capel van Aldenavesaet", and means before the chapel of Avezaath to distinguish from Kerk-Avezaath. The village developed along the Waal River. The church dates from the 14th century, and was modified in 1705. The church tower dates from 1783. In 1840, it was home to 447 people.

== Gallery ==
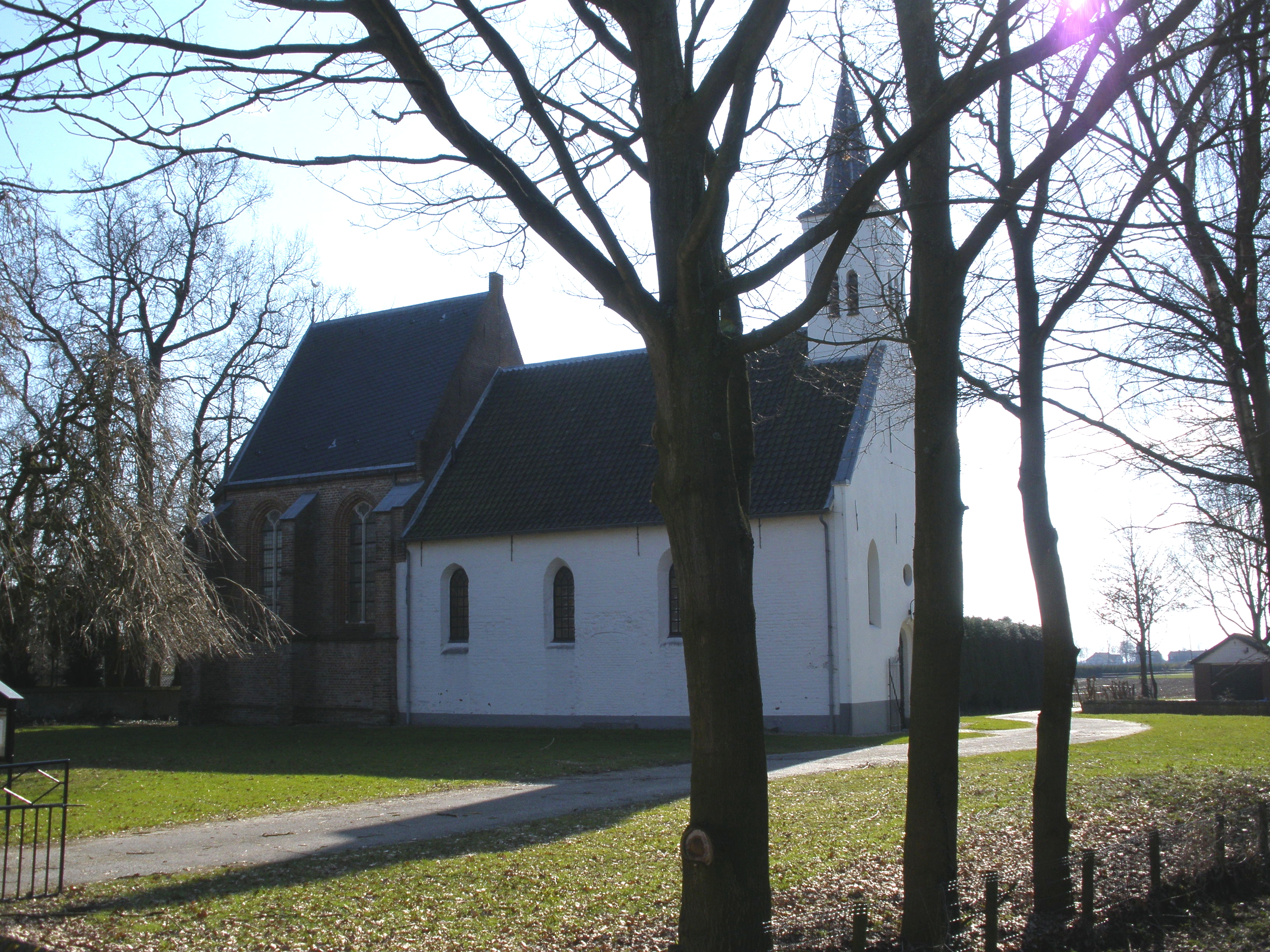
Agatha chapel

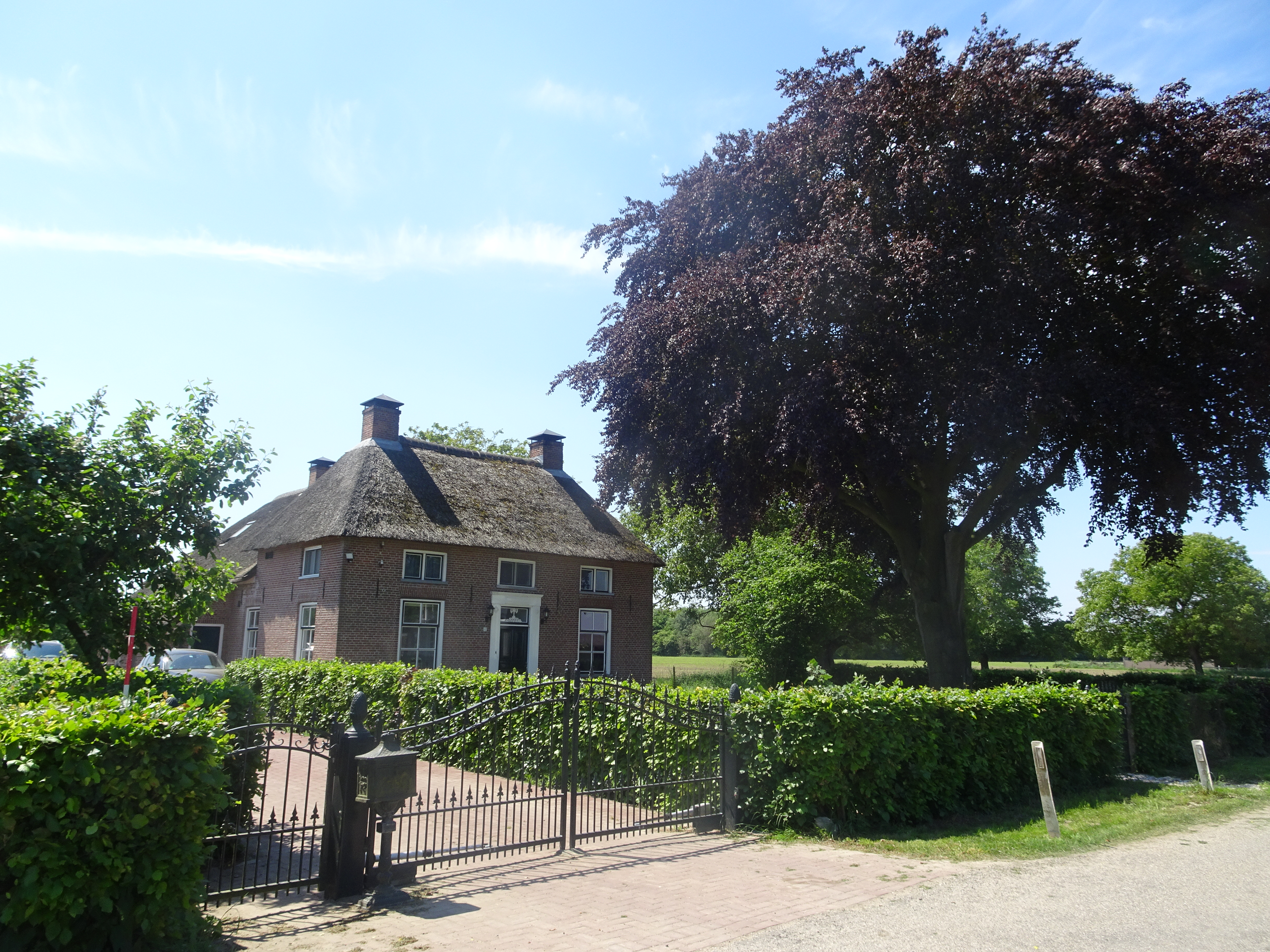
Farm in Kapel-Avezaath

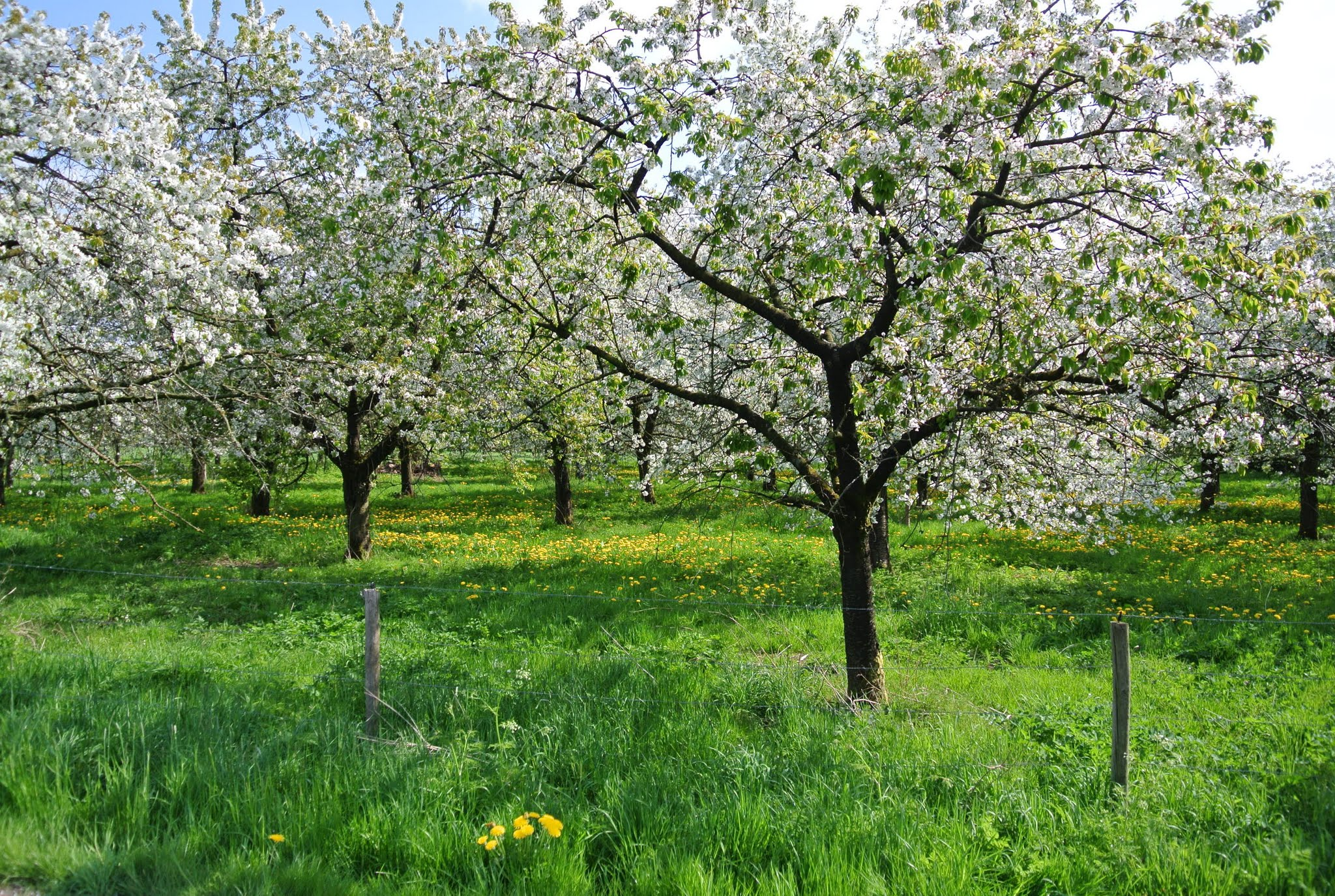
Fruit trees in bloom
