= Annie Foore =

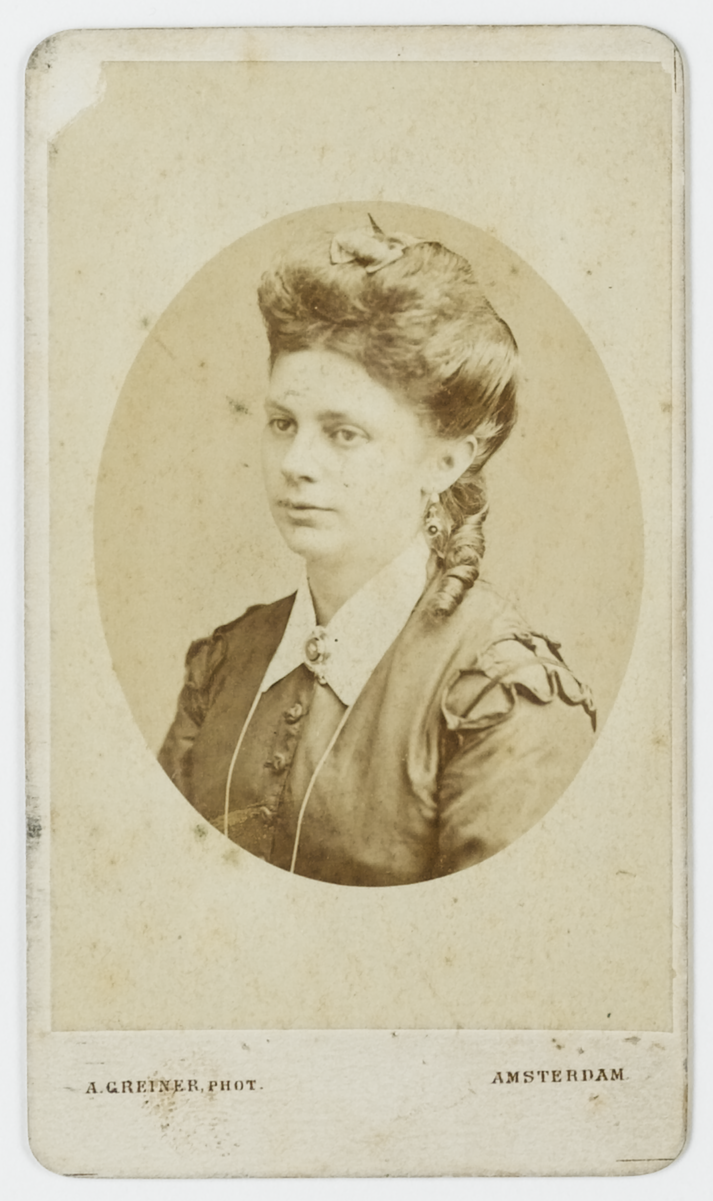
Portrait of Annie Foore (circa 1870)

Annie Foore was the pen name of Francisca Johanna Jacoba Alberta IJzerman-Junius (March 26, 1847 – June 2, 1890). She was a Dutch-born writer who lived in Dutch East Indies. She was considered one of the most important European women authors writing in the Dutch East Indies.

The daughter of Franciscu Johannes Jacobus Albertus Junius and Anna Maria Titia Burhoven Viëtor, she was born Francisca Johanna Jacoba Alberta Junius in Tiel. One of her sisters was the writer Johanna van Woude. She married Jan Willem IJzerman, an engineer, in 1873 and moved with him to Indonesia where he was employed in railway construction.

She died in Padang at the age of 43.

== Selected works ==
- Florence's droom (1872)
- Eén maar deelbaar, short stories (1875)
- De koloniaal en zijn overste, novel (1876)
- Uit ons Indisch familieleven (1887)
- Indische huwelijken (1887)
- Bogoriana, novel (1890)
