= Theodoor Gerard van Lidth de Jeude =

Dutch zoologist

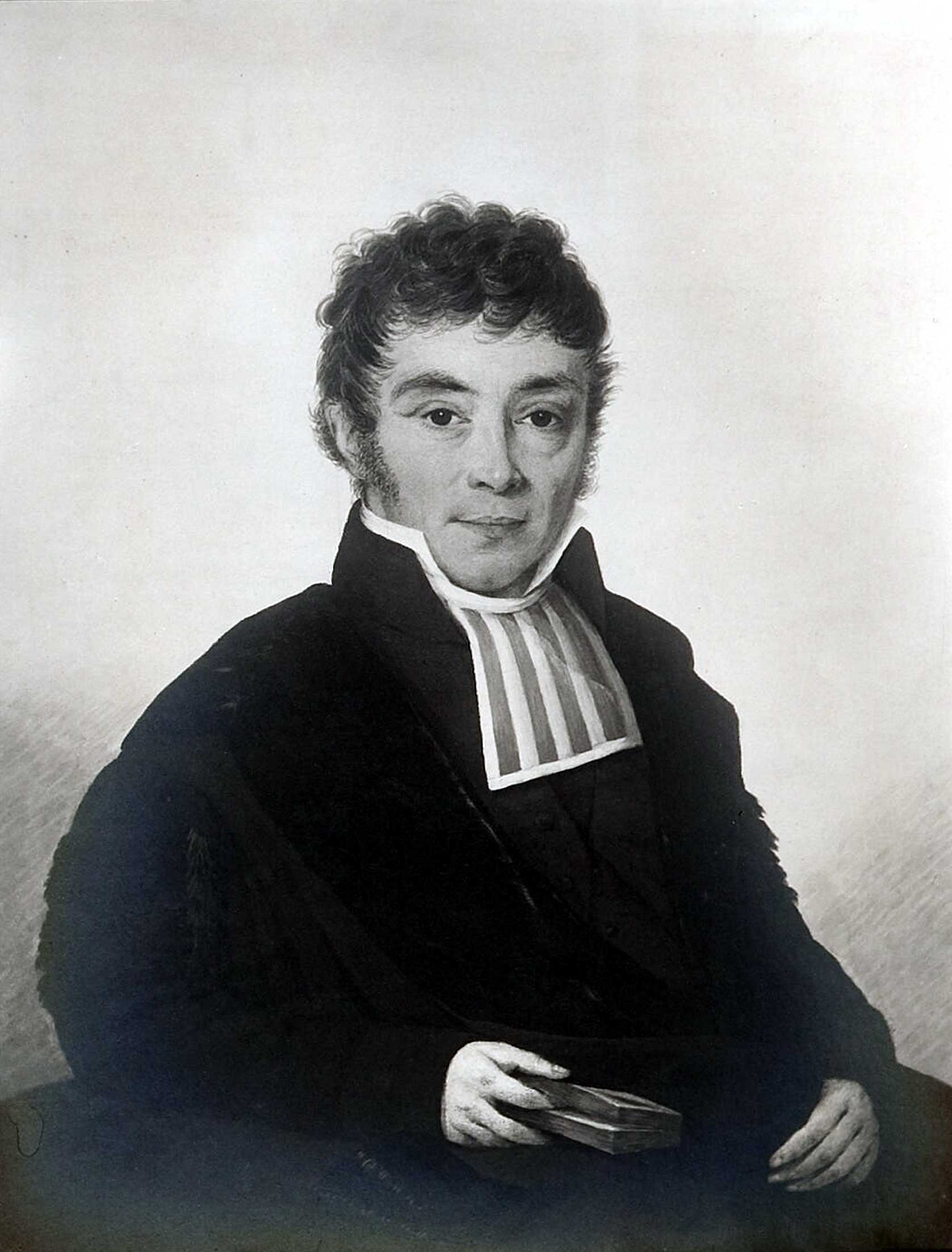
- Born: 8 July 1788; Tiel
- Died: 23 December 1863 (aged 75); Utrecht
- Occupations: Physician, veterinarian, and zoologist and was the first director of the newly established Rijks Veterinary College

Theodoor Gerard van Lidth de Jeude (8 July 1788 in Tiel – 23 December 1863 in Utrecht) was a Dutch medical doctor, veterinarian, and zoologist and was the first director of the newly established Rijks Veterinary College where Veterinary medicine was first taught in the Netherlands in late 1821. His primary contribution to science was the collecting of specimens.

== Life and career ==
Theodoor Gerard was born as the son of a mayor, Cornelis Philip van Lidth de Jeude (born 11 April 1744 in Tiel; died 27 February 1830 in Tiel) and his wife Anna Margaretha van Ee (born 12 February 1750 in Utrecht; died 28 May 1832 in Tiel). He studied philosophy and medicine at the Universities of Utrecht and Leiden from 1806. Subsequently, he worked as a physician at a hospital in Utrecht. In 1815, he became Professor of Anatomy and Physiology at the Athaneum in Harderwijk. In 1819, he became adjunct professor of animal science at the Utrecht University.

In 1820, he became professor of veterinary medicine and director of the Veterinary School in Utrecht, where he started in 1821 and taught until 1851. He was also a professor of zoology and became Rector of his alma mater in 1833/34. Lidth de Jeude retired in October 1858 and died five years later. He acquired the collection of Albertus Seba. His collection was sold at auction in 1867 and part was purchased by the Royal Dublin Society and is now in the National Museum of Ireland - Natural History. Other specimens were acquired by the British Museum through dealer Robert Damon and are now in the Natural History Museum in London.
