= Abdellah Dami =

Moroccan-Dutch journalist, presenter and writer

Abdellah Dami (born 25 January 1982 in Tiel, Netherlands) is a Moroccan-Dutch journalist, presenter and writer. He studied commercial economics and at age 20 he started a foundation called "Maghrebmedia" in response to the negative portrayal of immigrants in the media. At age 21, he published a book called "Couscous met appelmoes, dialoog met Marokkanen" (Couscous with apple sauce, dialogue with Moroccans) concerning life's issues of Moroccan youths. Later worked for "TV Noord Holland" where he presented his own show "Shoot" and radio station "FunX". From 2007 onward, he worked for the Netherlands Muslim Broadcasting Network (NMO) where he presented two shows, "Meetingpoint", a discussion programme and youth programme "In de waan van alledag" (Everyday Delusions). He also presents a youth programme on Radio 5 called "De Zevende Hemel" (Seventh Heaven).
