= Tiel =

- Municipality
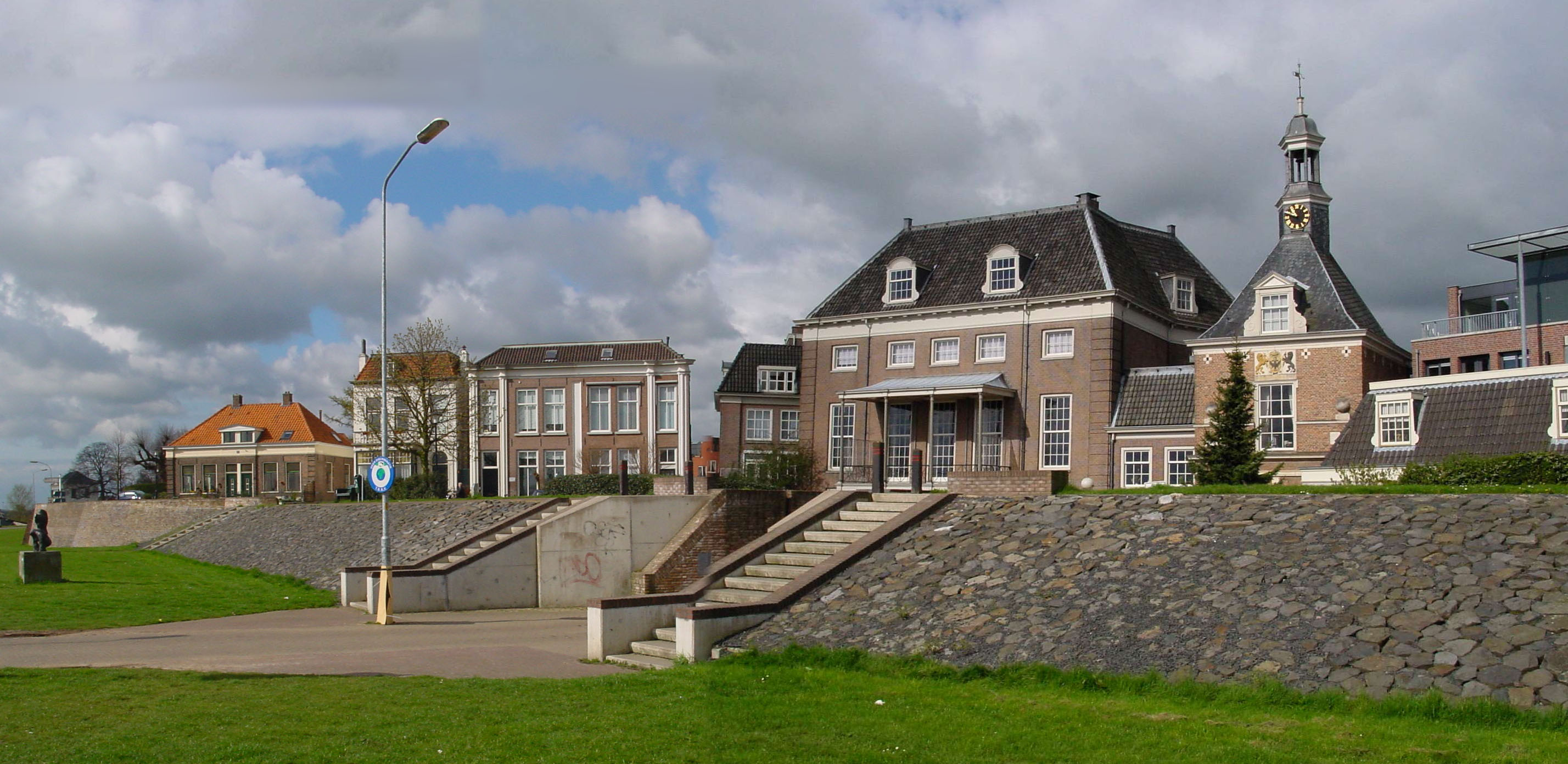
- Fortified dyke in Tiel

- Flag Coat of arms

- Location in Gelderland

- Location within the Netherlands Location within Europe
- Coordinates: 51°53′N 5°26′E
- Country: Netherlands
- Province: Gelderland

Government
  - Body: Municipal council
  - Mayor: Frank van der Meijden (CDA)

Area
  - Total: 35.51 km^{2} (13.71 sq mi)
  - Land: 32.88 km^{2} (12.70 sq mi)
  - Water: 2.63 km^{2} (1.02 sq mi)
- Elevation: 7 m (23 ft)

Population (January 2021)
  - Total: 41,920
  - Density: 1,275/km^{2} (3,300/sq mi)
- Demonym: Tielenaar
- Time zone: UTC+1 (CET)
  - Summer (DST): UTC+2 (CEST)
- Postcode: 4000–4007, 4013–4014, 4017, 4062
- Area code: 0344
- Website: www.tiel.nl

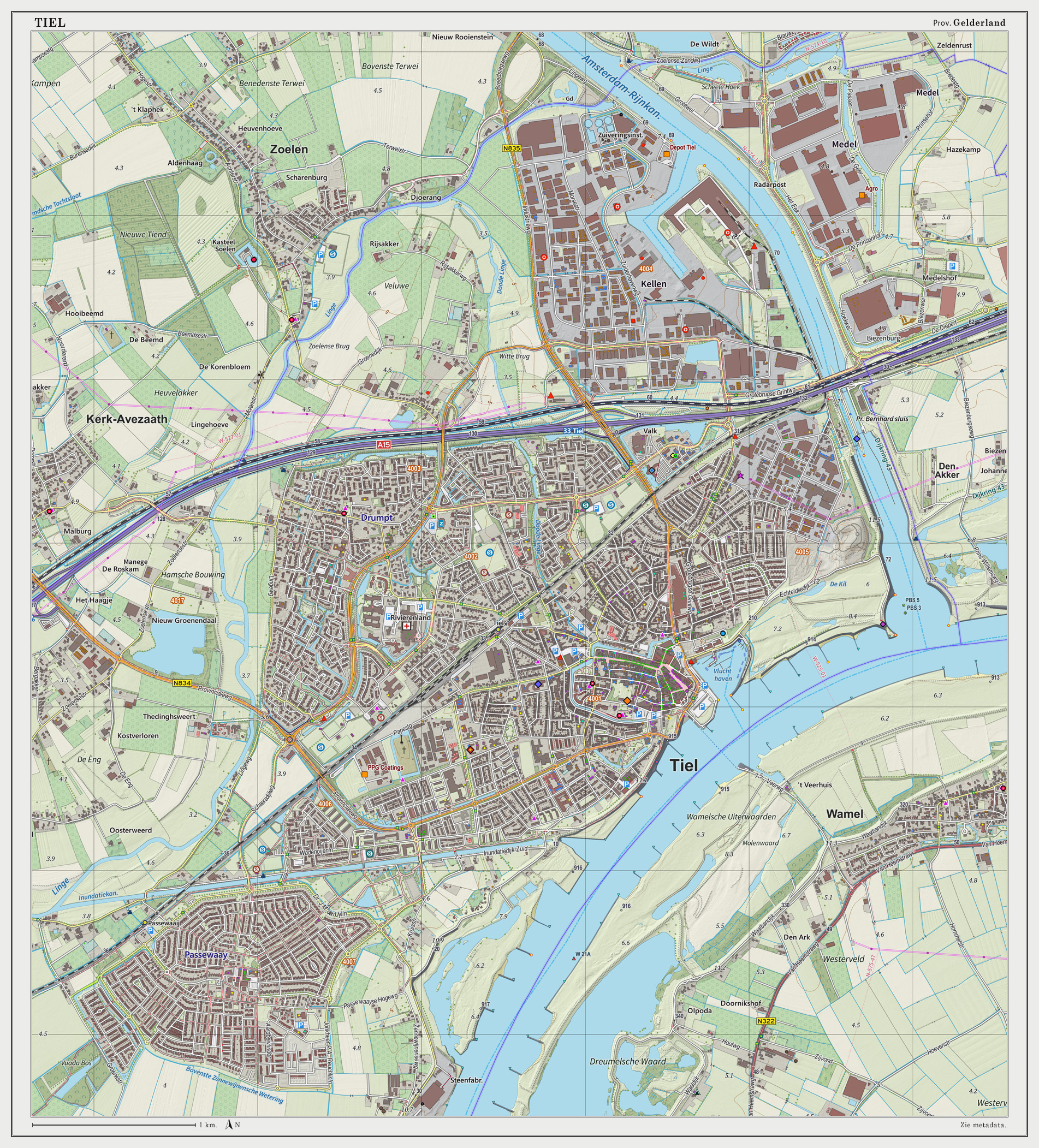
Dutch Topographic map of Tiel (town), as of March 2014

Tiel (Dutch pronunciation: [til]) is a municipality and a town in the middle of the Netherlands. The town is enclosed by the Waal river and the Linge river to the South and the North, and the Amsterdam-Rhine Canal to the East. Tiel comprises the population centres Kapel-Avezaath, Tiel and Wadenoijen. The city was founded in the 5th century CE.

== The town of Tiel ==
Chartered in 1200, the town of Tiel is known for its medieval ports, market town, and became a member of the Hanseatic League.

It has the St Martin's Church, and a water gate.

In 896, the Frankish king Zwentibold, a great-grandson of Charlemagne, granted Tiel the right to charge a toll, and during the 10th and 11th centuries, merchants from Tiel maintained close contacts with fellow merchants in England and Germany.

== Ancient history ==
Stonehenge of the Netherlands
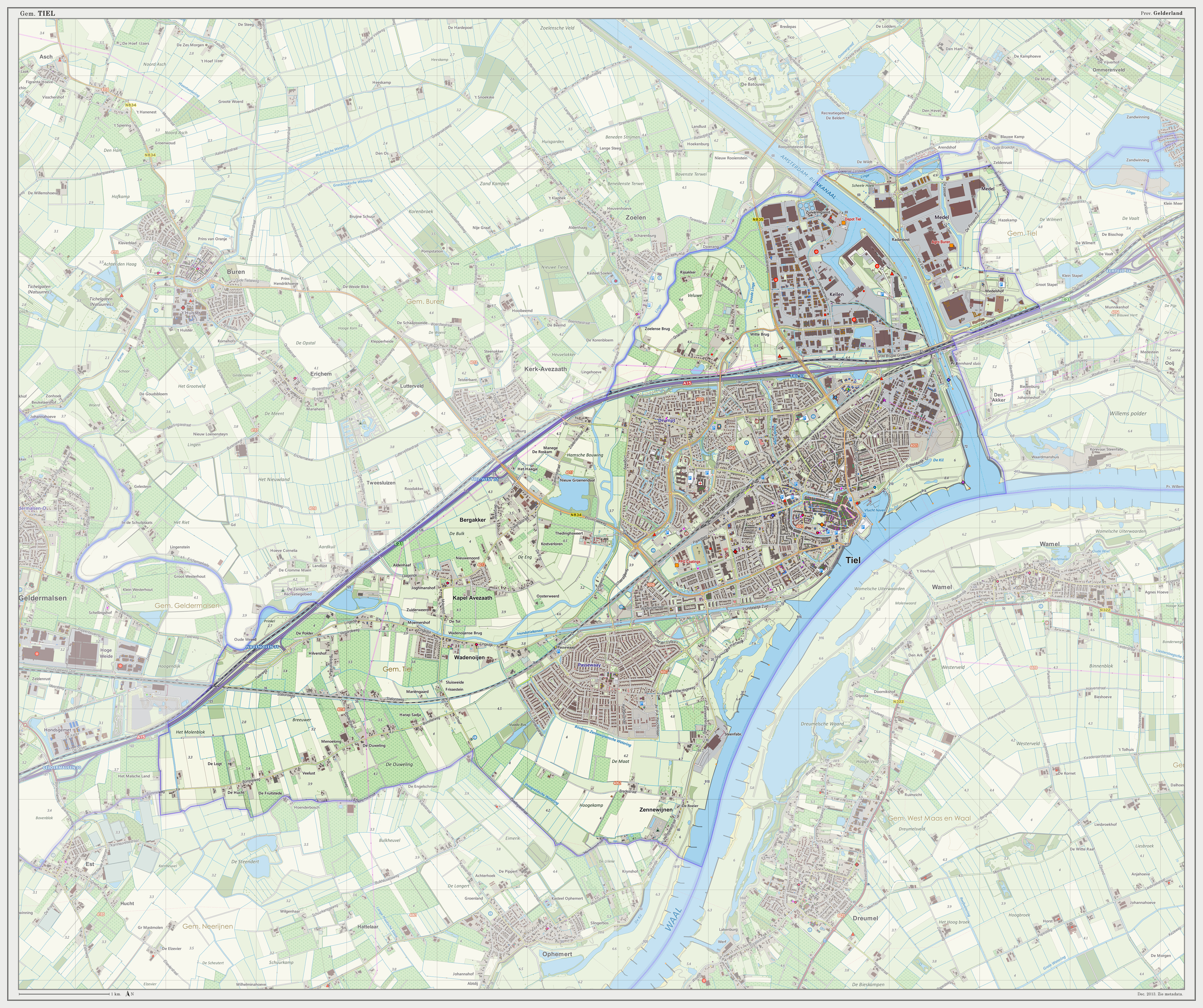
- Map of Tiel, Netherlands
- Created: 4000–4500 BCE
- Discovered: 2017
- Present location: Tiel (Artifacts that were found) Multiple institutions, including the National Museum of Antiquity in Leiden and the Flipje & Streekmuseum

Roman artifacts (Rings, statues, grave stones etc) have been found in Tiel.

The "Stonehenge of the Netherlands" is an ancient site that is over 4,000 years old. The structure shows a similarity to Stonehenge in southern England; so it was dubbed "Stonehenge of the Netherlands" by the local media.

It was used as a burial mound and for religious practices. It is located in Tiel, Netherlands, and its excavation started in 2017. According to the town's website, this was the first such discovery in the Netherlands.

The mound contained remains of around 60 individuals. Three mounds were discovered; the main one is about 20 metres (65 ft) in diameter. Its passages align with the sun at equinoxes and solstices, and according to the archeologists it served as a solar calendar.

Around one million objects, dating from the Stone Age, Bronze Age, Iron Age, Roman Empire and throughout the Middle Ages, have been found. The oldest artifacts can be traced back to 2500 BCE.

One of the most interesting finds was a glass bead which is the oldest ever discovered in the Netherlands. The archeologists think it originated in Mesopotamia, modern day Iraq. The group assumes that the Bronze Age inhabitants of this area had contact with groups more than 3,000 miles away.

The archaeologists also discovered offerings like animal skeletons, human skulls and bronze spearheads.

== Notable people ==
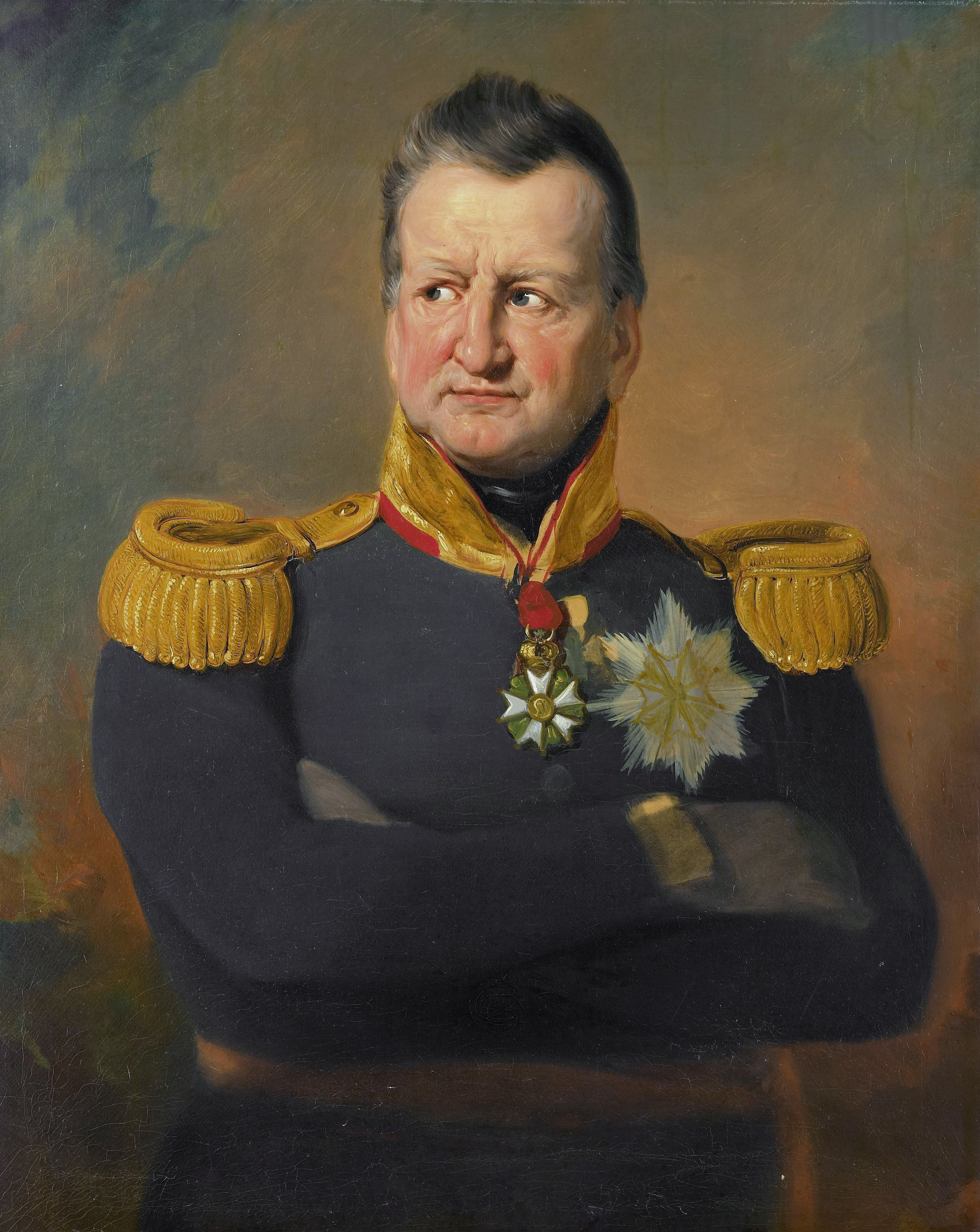
General D H Chassé, 1832

=== Public service ===
- Joan van der Capellen tot den Pol (1741–1784) statesman, active in the Batavian Republic
- David Hendrik Chassé (1765–1849) soldier who fought both for and against Napoleon
- Theodoor Gerard van Lidth de Jeude (1788–1863) physician, veterinarian and zoologist
- Antonie Frederik Jan Floris Jacob van Omphal (1788–1863) lieutenant-general and extraordinary aide-de-camp to William III of the Netherlands
- Cornelis Pijnacker Hordijk (1847–1908) jurist and politician, Governor-General of the Dutch East Indies 1888/1893
- William Hendriksen (1900–1982) New Testament scholar and writer of Bible commentaries
- Marinus van IJzendoorn (born 1952) human development professor, co-leader of Generation R

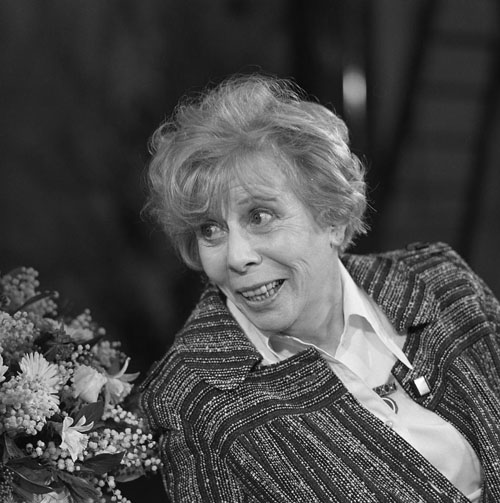
Mary Dresselhuys, 1982

=== The arts ===
- Annie Foore (1847–1890) writer who lived in Dutch East Indies
- Mary Dresselhuys (1907–2004) stage actress
- Eylem Aladogan (born 1975) installation artist and sculptor
- Frans Duijts (born 1979) singer
- Abdellah Dami (born 1982) journalist, presenter and writer
- Corrie van Binsbergen (born 1957) jazz musician and composer

=== Sport ===
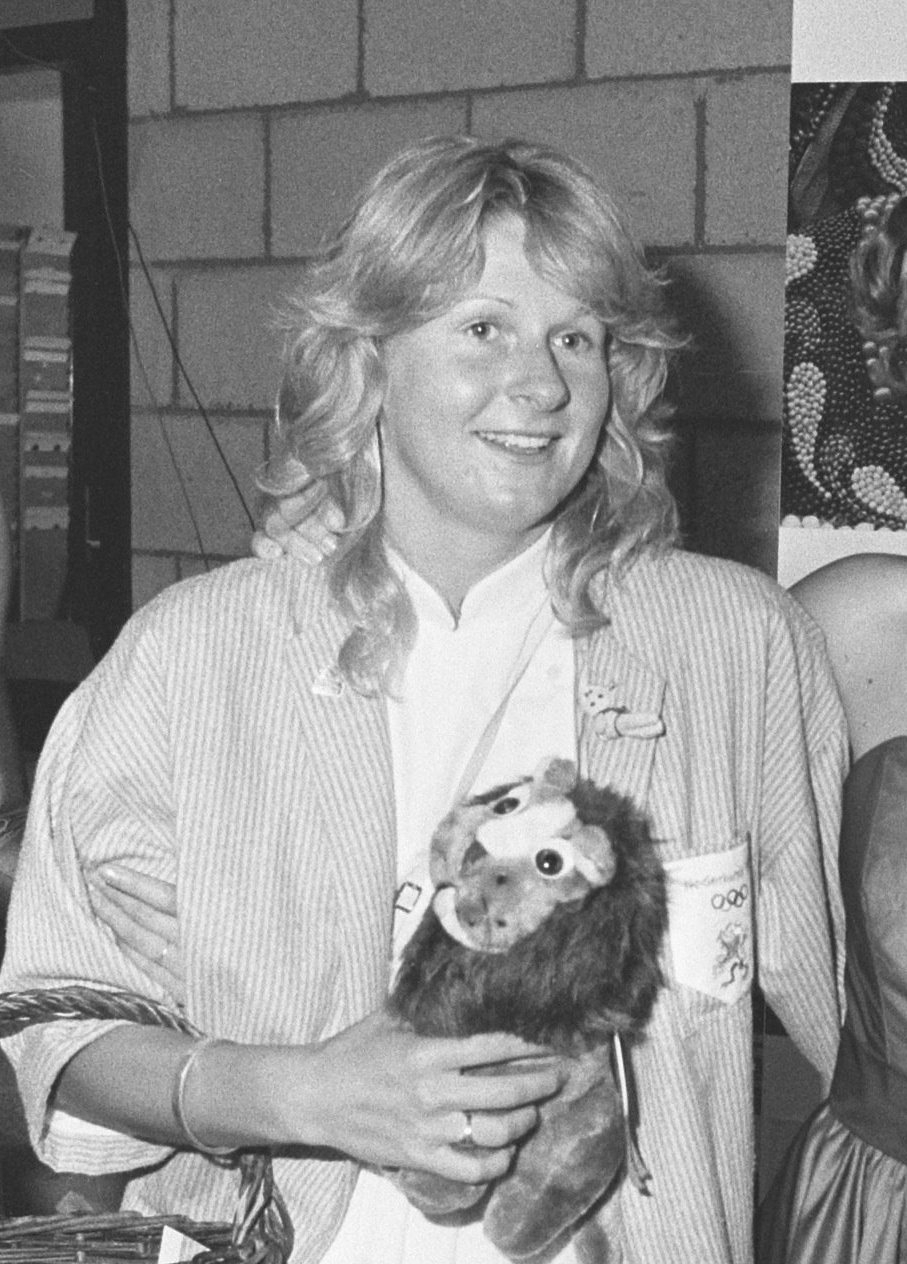
Wilma van Velsen, 1984

- Herman Claudius van Riemsdijk (born 1948) chess player
- Jan van Deinsen (born 1953) football player
- Nico Rienks (born 1962) rower, two-time gold medallist at the 1988 and 1996 Summer Olympics
- Anton Janssen (born 1963) football player
- Wilma van Velsen (born 1964) swimmer and team bronze and silver medallist in the 1980 and 1984 Summer Olympics
- Dirk Jan Derksen (born 1972) football player
- Bobbie Traksel (born 1981) racing cyclist
- Erik Pieters (born 1988) football player
- Barry Maguire (born 1989) football player
- Mattijs Branderhorst (born 1993) football player

== Gallery ==
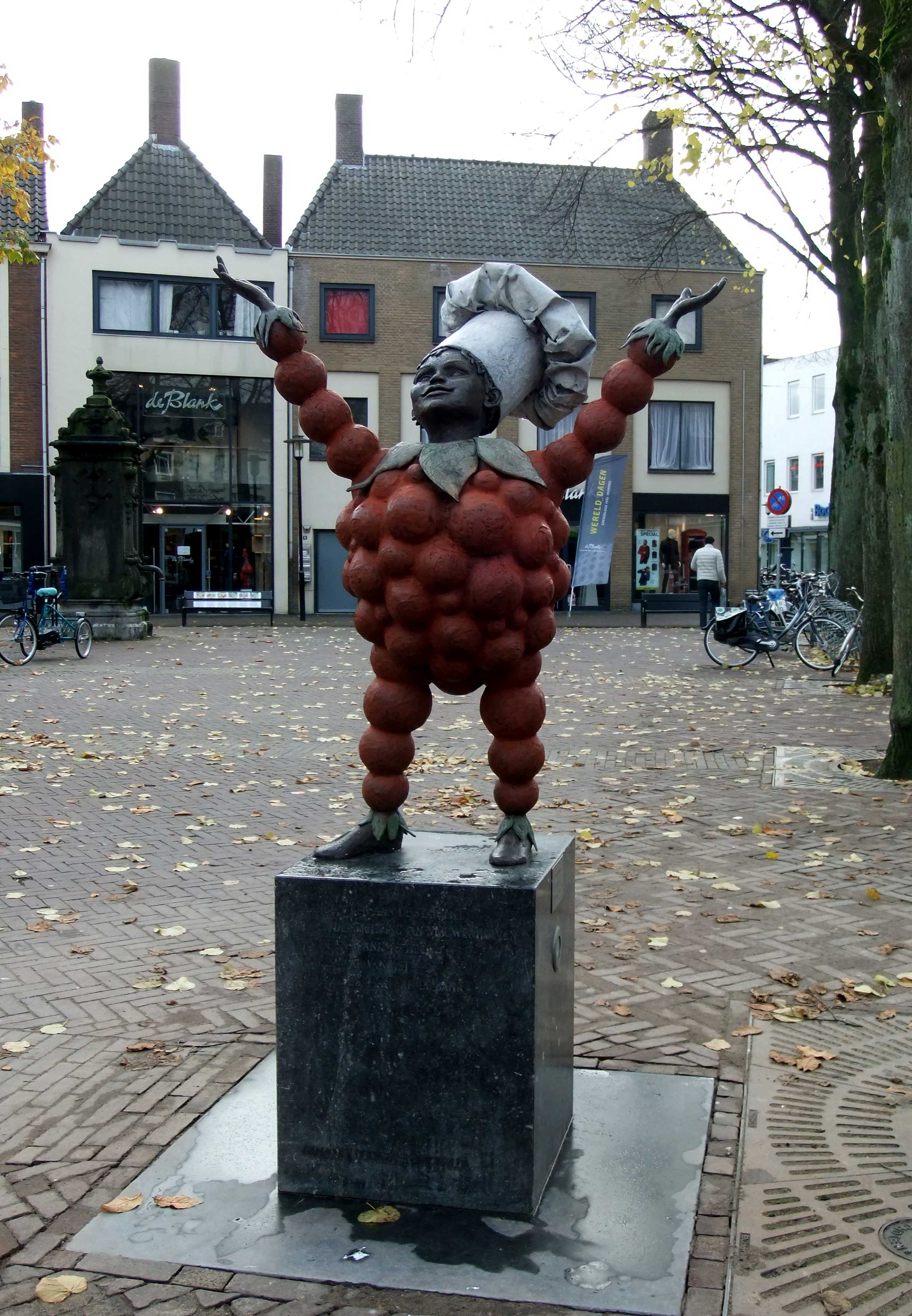
Statue of Flipje in Tiel

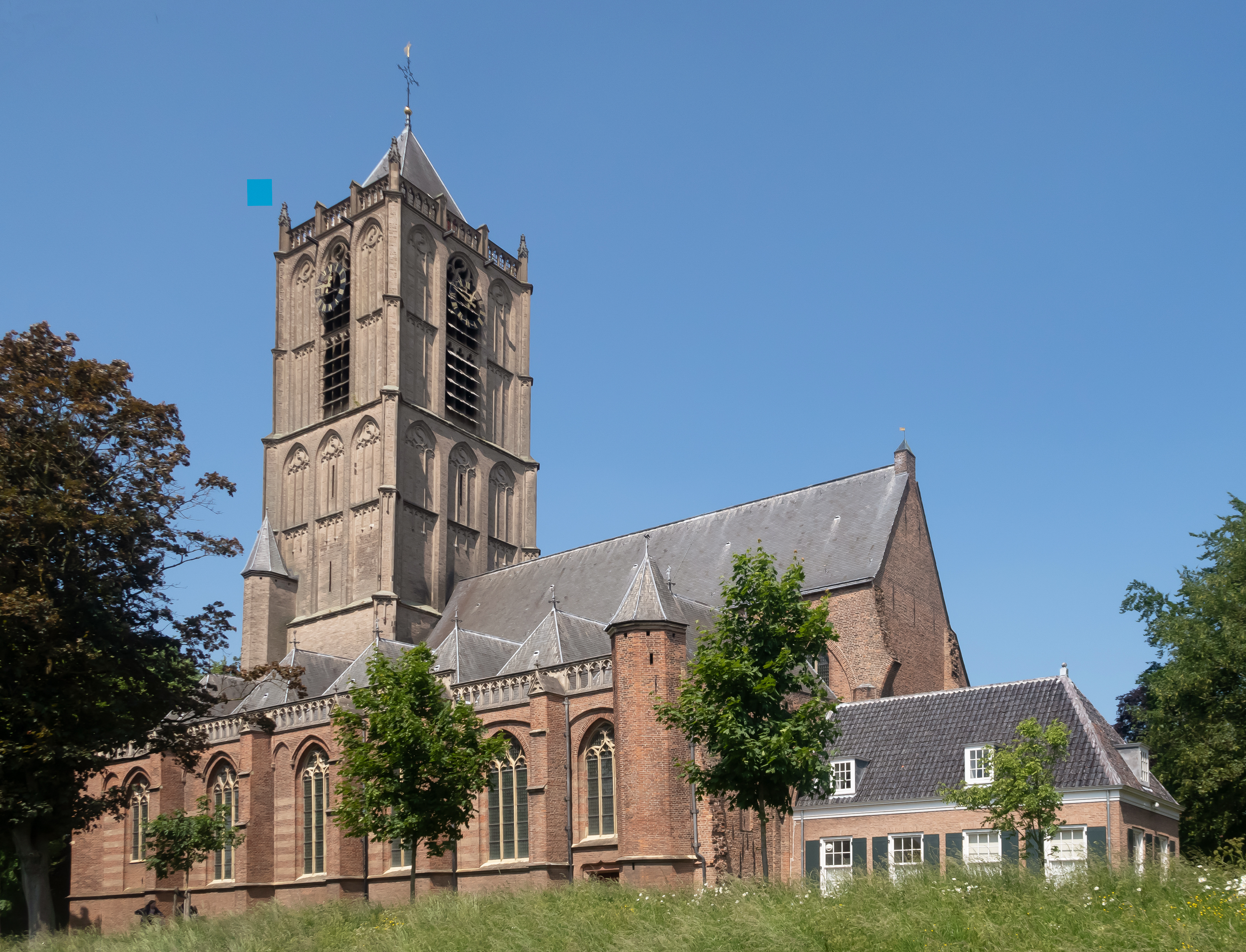
Tiel, church: Sint Maartenskerk

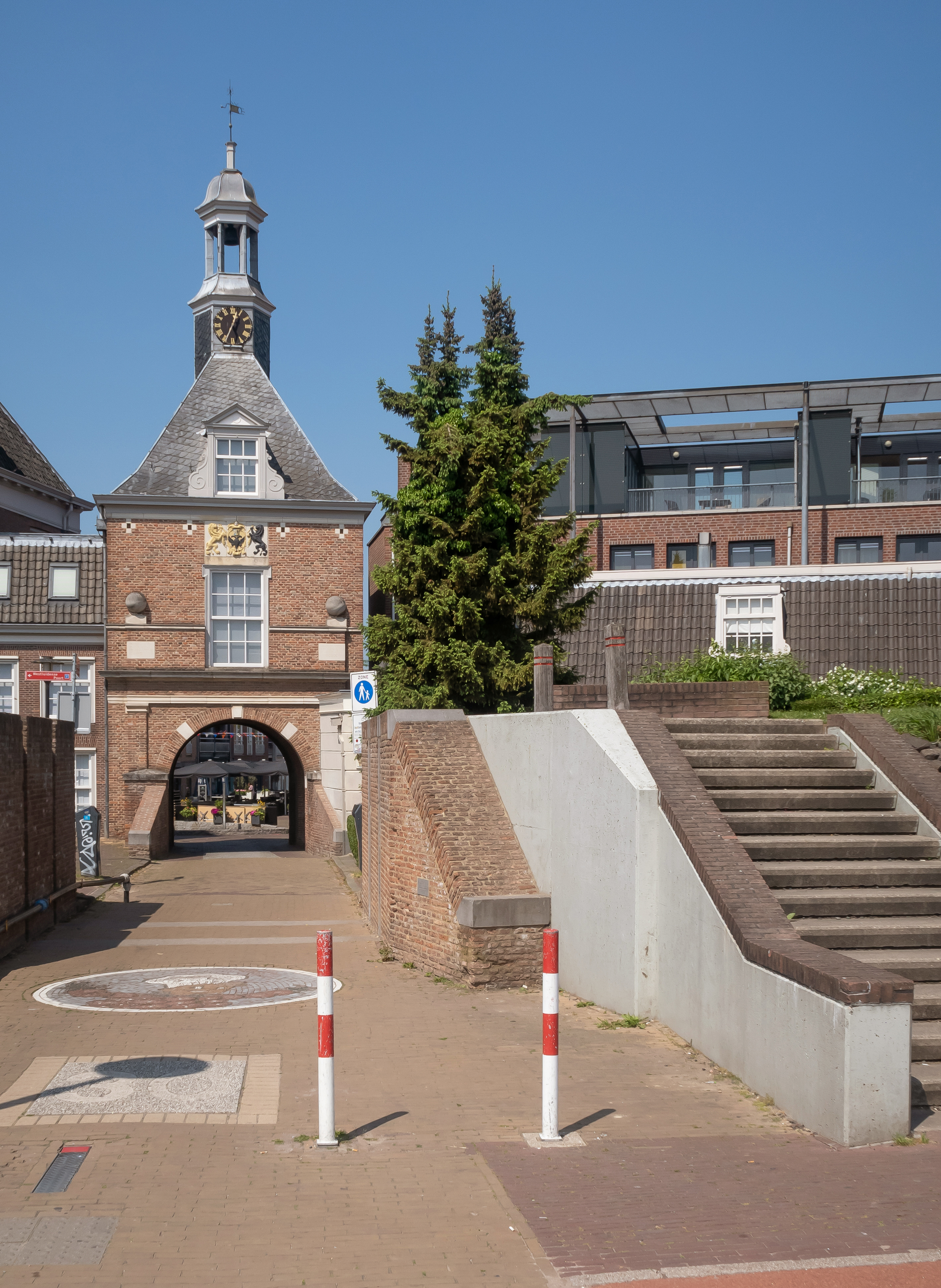
Town gate: Waterpoort

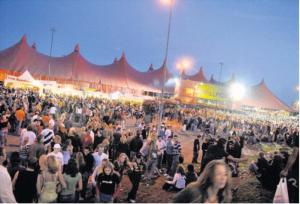
Tiel, Appelpop on the Waalkade, Tiel

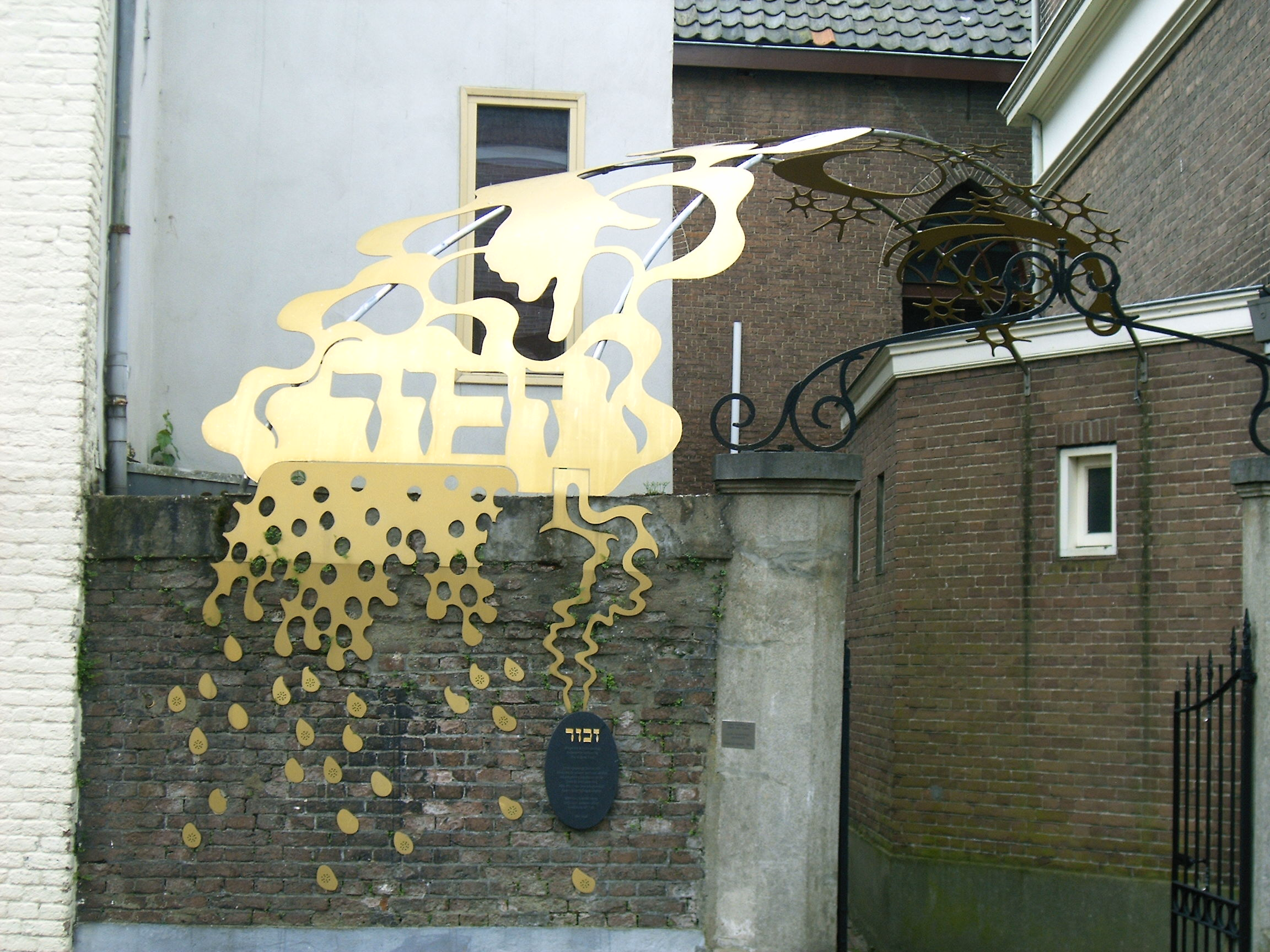
Jewish Monument, Tiel
