= Antonie Frederik Jan Floris Jacob van Omphal =

Dutch lieutenant-general and aide-de-camp

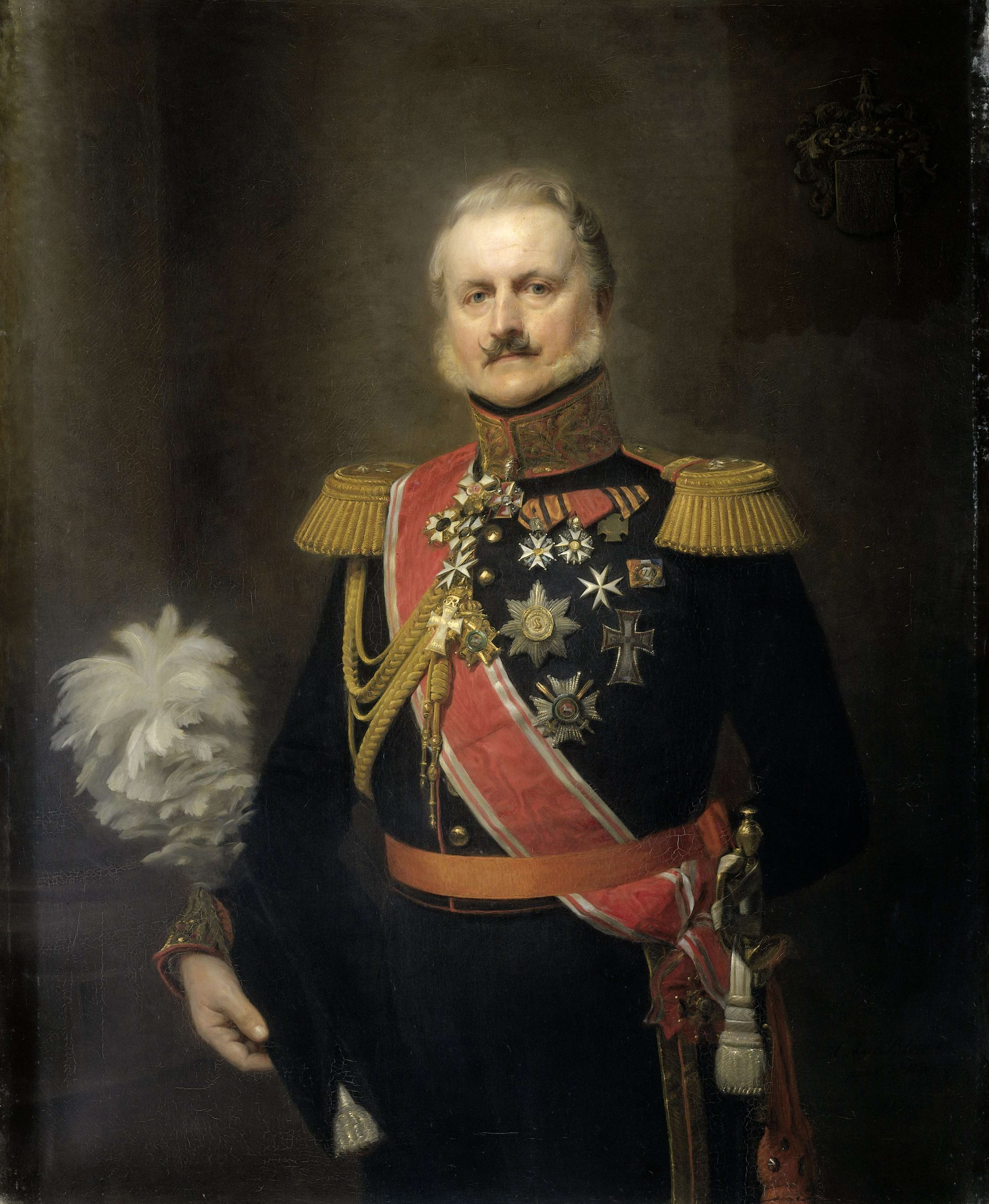
- Antonie Frederik Jan Floris Jacob van Omphal
- Born: 2 May 1788; Tiel, Dutch Republic
- Died: 8 July 1863 (aged 75); The Hague, Netherlands
- Military career
- Allegiance: Kingdom of Holland (1809–1810) (First French Empire) French First Empire (1810–1813); Principality of the Netherlands (1813–1815); United Kingdom of the Netherlands (1815–1839); Netherlands (1839–1851)
- Service years: 1813–1851
- Rank: Lieutenant-general
- Conflicts: Napoleonic Wars; French invasion of Russia; Battle of Leipzig; Battle of Quatre-Bras; Battle of Waterloo

Antonie Frederik Jan Floris Jacob Baron van Omphal, MWO (2 May 1788 – 8 July 1863) was a Dutch lieutenant-general and extraordinary aide-de-camp to William III of the Netherlands. He was awarded a knighthood in the Military William Order among other honours.

== Family background ==
Antonie Frederik Jan Floris Jacob van Omphal was born on 2 May 1788 in Tiel in the Dutch Republic. He was a son of Diederik van Omphal, lord of IJzendoorn (1752–1813), and his second wife Wilhelmina Anna Cornelia de Pagniet (1765–1806). His father and grandfather had been officers in the service of the Dutch States Army, the forces of the Staten-Generaal. His ancestor Jacob von Omphal (1500–1557) was ennobled by the Holy Roman Emperor Ferdinand I. Van Omphal himself was made a baron in 1834; he died, unmarried, in 1863, and his line came to an end.

== Military career ==
Van Omphal began his active service during the Kingdom of Holland. Part of the Dutch expeditionary force to Spain, he participated in the Battle of Ciudad Real. In 1810, the kingdom was annexed by the First French Empire and the Dutch forces were incorporated in the French army. As a result, in 1812 Van Omphal took part in the French invasion of Russia; he was one of the few Dutch survivors. He was noted for his courage during the Battle of Leipzig (16–18 October 1813); at the time he was a first lieutenant for the second regiment of lancers of the Imperial Guard of Napoleon I.

After the French defeat of 1814, Van Omphal entered the service of the new Principality of the Netherlands. He was present at the Battle of Quatre-Bras, where the Dutch forces blocked the advance of Marshall Ney, and two days later at the Battle of Waterloo. He was awarded the Military William Order in 1815, as a captain. On 1 November 1825 he was promoted to captain, serving as aide-de-camp to lieutenant-general David Hendrik Chassé. Van Omphal went on to serve as aide-de-camp for three kings: William I, Willem II, and William III. On 1 September 1831 he was made a lieutenant colonel, and after promotion to colonel in 1837 he commanded the first regiment of cuirassiers. He was honourably discharged from the army on 1 August 1851 with the pension and rank of lieutenant-general. In 1852 the king honoured Van Omphal by assigning him to attend the funeral of the Duke of Wellington. The two had been friends for many years; Wellington had held an annual banquet every 18 June commemorating Waterloo, which Van Omphal had always attended.

Van Omphal was made a knight in the Military William Order, Grand Cross (1849) and commander (1857) in the Order of the Oak Crown, a knight of the Legion of Honour, a commander of the Royal Guelphic Order and the Order of the Dannebrog, a knight of the Order of St. John, of the Order of St. Anna second class with diamonds, of the Order of the Red Eagle second class, of the Order of the Sword with grand cross and of the Order of Saint Stanislaus first class, and a Grand Officer of the Order of Leopold (1859). After his discharge he served among other posts as director of the fund for the widows and orphans of Army officers.

He died in The Hague on 8 July 1863, and was buried there at the Eik en Duinen cemetery.
