= Reward theory of attraction =

Mechanics of liking and romantic love

The reward theory of attraction states that people are attracted to individuals exhibiting behaviors that are rewarding to them, whom they associate with rewarding events, or have positive, fulfilling interactions with.

Reward theory was originally developed in the research on interpersonal attraction of the 1960s, a precursor to modern romantic love research. In this early context, "attraction" was often defined as "a positive attitude towards a particular person". Romantic love science was not explicitly studied yet in this period of history; the subject was even considered "taboo" for research.

Attraction was initially conceived of as a continuum, with liking being a "mild" form of attraction at one end, and romantic love being a "strong" attraction at the other end. This idea of a continuum started to change in 1970, when Zick Rubin published his distinction between "liking" and "loving". A later distinction was made by Elaine Hatfield between "passionate" and "companionate" love. Passionate love is "a state of intense longing for another" which involves incentive salience ("wanting", or what is attention-grabbing). Companionate love is "the affection we feel for those with whom our lives are deeply entwined" (or "strong liking").

A successor to reward theory is the self-expansion model by Arthur & Elaine Aron in 1986, which conceptualizes reward as "whatever creates expansion of the self". Like reward theory, self-expansion encompasses "mini-theories" of falling in love and long-term relationships, and has been used to explain the process behind "strong attractions" like passionate love, and Dorothy Tennov's concept of limerence.

Another variant on reward theory, and early prevailing approach to attraction was social exchange theory.

A separate area of research was impression formation, which studied those impressions based on knowledge (i.e. information), rather than the emotional reactions (i.e. affect) studied by interpersonal attraction.

== Predictors ==
Early interpersonal attraction research identified five major predictors of "attraction" (defined then as a "positive attitude"). In this early paradigm, it was assumed that falling in love occurs with an exceptionally strong instance of one of these.

- Similarity (as in "birds of a feather flock together") is an idea dating as far back as Aristotle. The most successful research of this type showed a direct relationship between liking and one's attitudinal agreement on a variety of issues (social, political, or artistic). Studies also demonstrated personality similarity among husbands, wives and friends, although it was unclear to what extent such similarity actually caused attraction. It might also be the case that marriage makes a couple more similar over time, or that such similarity is "more perceived than actual". Similarity can be seen as reinforcing in two ways: we would expect to have more positive outcomes from interactions with a similar person, and interacting with a person who has similar attitudes increases the probability of our validation or competence.
- Propinquity (similarity of location) has been found to result in attraction. People who are seated together or live nearby tend to become friends, and the mere exposure effect (e.g. being able to glimpse a fellow student, regardless of similarity) has been shown to elicit attraction.
- Being liked by a person tends to cause liking towards that person in return, also known as the reciprocal liking rule. A study on falling in love found that a sudden attraction was most frequently associated with a person's discovery of another's attraction to them. As one participant describes, "I met [her] in a department store in which she worked. I was looking for sandals and she recognized me and came over [...]. From that moment on, I thought a lot about her; fantasizing relationships, etc."
- Admirable characteristics of another person (especially e.g. physical attractiveness, but also good health, youthfulness, intelligence, mental health, general competence, and so on) can be a source of reward, which is suggested to be derived from the imagined or projected future interactions with the person wherein those characteristics would make the person either reinforcing or punishing. According to the "matching hypothesis", while a person might also prefer a relationship with an extremely attractive person, they would rather not run the risk of rejection either. A more attractive person might try to "do better" with somebody else. Therefore, according to a "marketplace of open competition", one's relationships tend to be limited to those who also have a similar level of attractiveness. This matching of similar traits is also called "homogamy"; dissimilarity is "heterogamy".
- Social and cultural influences contribute to who people are likely to meet, who they are allowed to associate with, and what characteristics are viewed as attractive and important.

=== Self-expansion ===
The self-expansion model summarized

The core of the self-expansion model as we have applied it to love can be oversimplified as the following three principles:

1. People seek to expand the self.
2. One way they seek to do so is by attempting to include others in the self through close relationships.
3. People seek situations and experiences that have become associated with experiences of expansion of the self.

— Elaine Aron & Arthur Aron (1996)

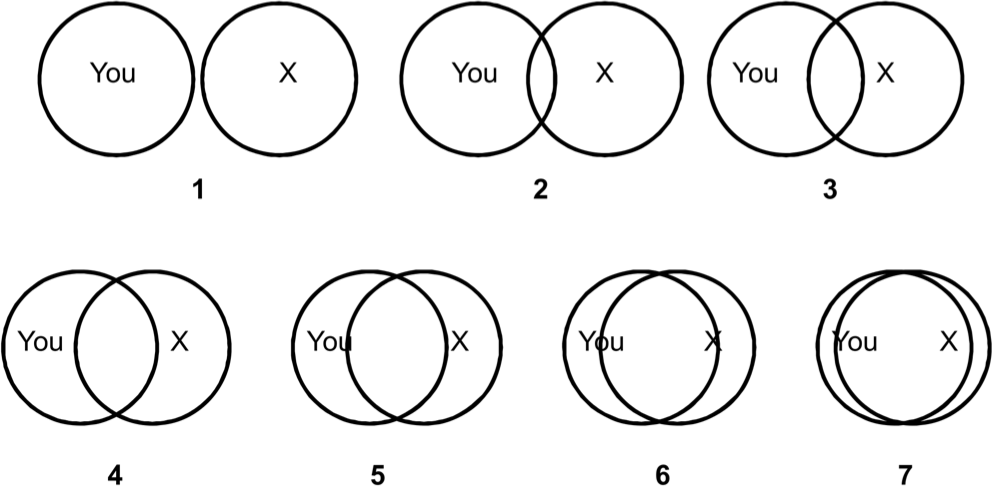
Inclusion of the other in the self (IOS) is typically measured with the IOS Scale.

A limitation of early reward theory was that it could not predict exactly what is rewarding, only determine it by observation (i.e. with studies). To solve this, Arthur & Elaine Aron developed the self-expansion model, which specifies reward as "whatever creates expansion of the self". Self-expansion is the human motivation to expand one's physical influence, cognitive complexity, social or bodily identity, and self-awareness. Relationships are a key area for self-expansion then, via "inclusion of the other in the self", where aspects of a partner (e.g. traits, skills, attitudes, resources, abilities, and worldviews) are incorporated into one's own self concept. Self-expansion can also take the form of having new and exciting experiences with a partner.

The Arons revise the definition of "attraction" to mean a desire to enter a close relationship, usually reflected in attitudes or behaviors. According to their theory, attraction arises when opportunities for self-expansion are perceived, and so a "positive attitude" towards a person (the earlier definition) is only a "frequent symptom". Self-expansion is then used to explain the "strong attraction" of romantic love, including intense varieties of passionate love or limerence, when the rate of expansion is rapid and approaches the maximum total possible from all sources. Additionally, self-expansion explains how unrequited love can be a desired experience.

Besides romantic love, opportunities for self-expansion include learning, career, family, friendship, athletics, travel, artistic expression, politics, gossip, religion, and the experience of nature.

The Arons use a value-expectancy approach to determine attraction as the combination of two factors (desirability and probability):

1. Perceived degree of potential expansion of self that is possible through a close relationship with that particular other.
2. Perceived probability of actually obtaining that expansion with other—that is, probability that one could actually form and maintain a close relationship with this particular other.

According to the self-expansion model, attraction would actually seem to result from the opposite of the five predictors (because e.g. similarity would actually seem to minimize self-expansion—resulting in less attraction). Therefore, the Arons propose that these are five preconditions which make a relationship possible, whereas attraction according to self-expansion increases when the opposite conditions are present. For example, a person may be attracted to similarity when it provides the basis for effective communication or predictability, whereas differences provide the basis for self-expansion: new challenges, new experiences, new resources, etc. The Arons interpret study results (some of which did show dissimilarity was attractive) to mean that in their model, similarity is attractive because it increases the probability of a relationship. If a person believes forming a relationship will be easy, then dissimilarity becomes more attractive for self-expansion.

Passion seems to decline when interactions with a love object become frequent, showing that both propinquity and distance can facilitate attraction. Accordingly, in the tradition of medieval romance, the love object was always inaccessible, and modern people still seem to be "obsessed with the unknown, mysterious lover". The violation of social norms could also be an experience for self-expansion "towards greater autonomy, clearer personal values, new social roles, and the like"—as in the "Romeo and Juliet effect", where parental disapproval seems to enhance romantic love.

An fMRI experiment found that neural activity in regions associated with the physical attractiveness of potential alternative romantic partners was diminished when the participants were primed with a recollection of self-expansion in their current relationship. This effect "may be because the current relationship is bolstered by feelings of self-expansion diminishing the relative attractiveness and therefore the incentive salience of alternative partners". Low self-expansion in a relationship increases interest in alternatives, and the risk of infidelity.

=== Relativity of reward ===
Additionally, studies have shown that different individuals can be affected differently by the same potential reward, and that the meaning of a reward can vary with the conditions of its receipt or the specific goals of the individual (e.g. whether it satisfies a present need).

- In an experiment in which subjects were instructed to either cooperate or compete in a word game (in which the partner always won most of a monetary reward), partners were liked better when they followed instructions (either cooperating or competing), rather than when they behaved "inappropriately" and always shared the money. Therefore, it cannot be assumed that altruistic behavior is always viewed positively; it could also be viewed as inappropriate in some situations, even belittling, patronizing or manipulative.
- A study found that subjects who had racial prejudice liked an individual more when the individual evaluated them positively on personality characteristics, even if they had racial bias against the individual, but not as much as they liked an individual whom they did not have racial bias against.
- Two studies found a difference in whether subjects liked a person who gave them a positive evaluation, when they were led to believe they had done poorly on a task. In one study, the subjects were telephone operators who might have known each other, and did not like positive evaluators more than negative evaluators in the situation where they did not share the positive opinion. In the other study, the subjects were strangers who did always like the positive evaluators better, interpreted as being more likely to accept the evaluations at face value.
- A study found that when subjects presented arguments on a contemporary issue, whether they liked an evaluator depended on whether they presented their own position or not. If they presented their own position, liking depended on the evaluator's agreement with the position; if they presented a position opposite to their own, liking primarily depended on whether they agreed on the evaluation of their performance instead.
- A group of studies have shown that individuals who give a positive evaluation are liked better when their positive evaluation is received after a negative evaluation. For example, attraction to an agreeing person is greater after disagreement by others than after agreement, interpreted as drive reducing, wherein disagreement is arousing and subsequent agreement reduces this drive state.
- Which personality characteristics are liked has been found to depend on an individual's own personality and culture.

== Readiness ==
A "readiness" to enter a relationship is identified as an antecedent to falling in love, originally emphasized by the psychoanalyst Theodor Reik. Readiness is also likened to the idea of being "in love with love". The process of falling in love can be seen as an interplay between both this readiness (on the one hand), and a potential partner's appeal (on the other hand). Sometimes readiness can be so intense that a person falls in love with somebody who only has a minimal appeal. With lower readiness, the specific set of partner characteristics becomes more important.

Reik believed that unhappy people tend to be the most vulnerable to love, elaborating on a claim by Sigmund Freud that "happy people never make fantasies, only unsatisfied ones do". Elaine Hatfield concurs, saying "the greater our need, the more grandiose our fantasies". When one is most dissatisfied, their idealization is said to become an entire fantasy structure mixed up with reality, draped around the loved one; hence, according to clinical theories, romantic love tends to actually grow from one's unfulfilled needs, deficiencies, or dissatisfaction with oneself. Abraham Maslow called such love "deficiency-love", for the same reason, and contrasted it with "being-love": what one ought to aspire to in his view, but few experience.

An experiment by Hatfield found that college women whose self-esteem was lowered by negative feedback liked a man who asked them out on a date more than those women whose self-esteem was raised by positive feedback. The finding has been related as fitting a drive-reduction interpretation of reinforcement, that is, liking was greater for those that needed the ego boost of a potentially positive experience. Another important factor to readiness is loneliness. Phillip Shaver & Cindy Hazan argued that if people have many unmet social needs and are unaware, then a sign somebody is interested in them may become magnified into something quite unrealistic.

Readiness is described as heightening one's susceptibility to limerence—the kind of passionate love (or "all-absorbing" infatuated love) which is commonly unrequited, and felt for somebody unreachable.

== Fantasy ==
Interpersonal attraction researchers generally assumed liking is based on the actual rewards from interpersonal contact; however, Ellen Berscheid & Elaine Hatfield have also written that it seems doubtful that people are so "reality-bound". They suggest the potential future rewards one fantasizes about are an important consideration in the generation of passionate & romantic love:

When the lover closes his eyes and daydreams, he can summon up a flawless partner—a partner who instantaneously satisfies all his unspoken, conflicting, and fleeting desires. In fantasy he may receive unlimited reward or he may anticipate that he would receive unlimited reward were he ever to actually meet his ideal. Compared to our grandiose fantasies, the level of reward we receive in our real interactions is severely circumscribed. As a consequence, sometimes the most extreme passion is aroused by partners who exist only in imagination or partners who are barely known.

Dorothy Tennov believed that passionate fantasy must seem at least somewhat plausible, however unrealistic. When contact with a loved one is only limited, people can also tend to only notice the good things. With more routine contact, they could notice the things they don't like and become bored.

== Reinforcement ==
The mechanics of interpersonal attraction are believed to follow principles of reinforcement and classical conditioning.

"Reinforcement" is the strengthening of learning in some way; several different paradigms are distinguished:

- Positive reinforcement (reward) increases the frequency of a response leading to a desired stimulus.
- Negative reinforcement also increases the frequency of a response, but with an aversive stimulus which must be removed or avoided.
- Punishment (different from negative reinforcement) is a painful or unwanted stimulus that decreases the frequency of a response leading to the encounter.

Classical (or Pavlovian) conditioning is essentially learning by association: when two things happen together, we come to associate them and expect them together. Ivan Pavlov, who developed the theory, is said to have trained dogs to salivate (having an automatic reflex response) at the sound of a bell by repeatedly ringing it when food was delivered. In this paradigm, a "neutral stimulus" is paired along with a biological stimulus (an "unconditioned stimulus") which elicits a usually innate reflex response (an "unconditioned response") so that when the previously neutral stimulus (now a "conditioned stimulus") is presented again by itself it elicits a new reflex response (a "conditioned response").

Law of attraction

As revised by Byrne and Rhamey (1965), the law states that

$Y = m \left [\frac{\sum (PR \times M)}{\sum (PR \times M) + \sum (NR \times M')} \right ] + k$

(where Y is the attraction, M and M′ are magnitudes and m and k are the slope and Y intercept, respectively), or that attraction toward a person is a positive linear function of the sum of the weighted positive reinforcements (Number × Magnitude) associated with him, divided by the total number of weighted positive and negative reinforcements associated with him.

— Gerald Clore & Donn Byrne (1974)

In Pavlovian theory, reinforcement is described as this repeated pairing of an unconditioned (or unlearned) stimulus along with a conditioned (or learned) one, which strengthens the association, until eventually the conditioned stimulus elicits the response on its own. According to a similar mechanic, liking for a person results when an individual experiences reward in the presence of that person, although regardless of the actual relationship between the person and the rewarding event. The liked person then becomes a secondary reinforcer, meaning if their presence is contingent on a particular behavior, that behavior should be strengthened.

The "reinforcement-affect model", developed by Donn Byrne & Gerald Clore, additionally posits that attraction is based on the positive affect which accompanies reinforcement, and that these feelings spread from one stimulus to another via association:

(a) a variety of social communications and other interpersonal events can be classed as either reinforcing or punishing; (b) reinforcing events elicit positive affect, while punishing events generate negative affect; (c) stimuli associated with positive or negative affect develop the capacity to evoke that affect; and (d) stimuli that evoke positive affect are liked, while stimuli that evoke negative affect are disliked. Thus, one likes others who reward him because they are associated with one's own good feelings.

The authors also acknowledge a complexity in how this reinforcement functions in everyday situations: "Many of the associations made in the process of attraction development are between words, thoughts, images, or collections, rather than between buzzers, electric shocks, or visceral responses."

=== Liking by association ===
A variety of studies have been done which support the idea that people who are associated with reinforcement tend to be liked (via classical conditioning), even when they are not the source of reinforcement.

- An experiment by Pawel Lewicki tested this by giving participants a choice between two pictured women, asking them which looked friendlier, and the regular outcome was nearly 50-50. However, when the participants had a friendly interaction beforehand with an experimenter who merely looked similar to a woman pictured, the similar-looking woman was chosen with a 6-to-1 margin. When the interaction was unfriendly, the similar-looking woman was nearly always avoided.
- Another experiment found that college students liked a stranger better when evaluating them in a pleasant room as compared to a hot room.
- Experiments on children found that students liked their classmates better when a teacher responded positively to other students (regardless if they had any instrumental connection to the teacher's positive or negative treatment), and children who merely helped another child with a series of Bingo games liked other children present, even though they had personally won nothing.

== Neuroscience ==
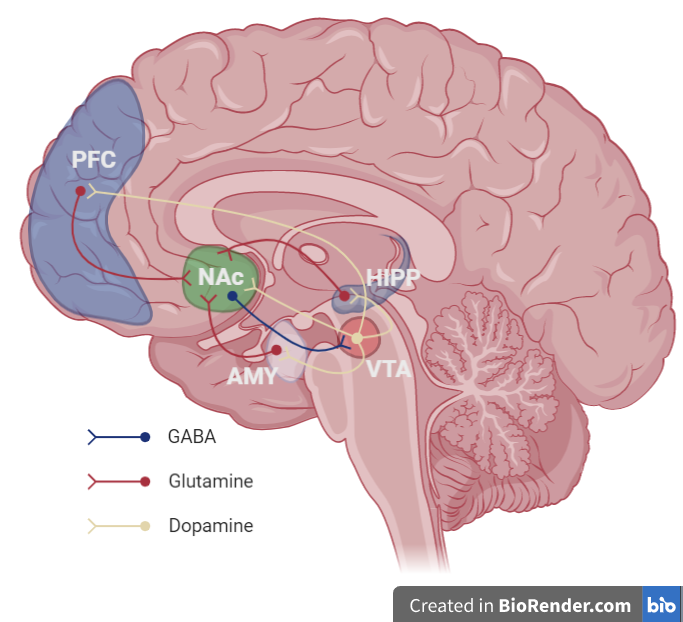
Dopamine is produced in the ventral tegmental area (VTA) of the brain, and projected to the nucleus accumbens (NAc). Dopamine activity in the NAc is key to the attribution of salience.

=== "Wanting" versus "liking" ===
In modern neuroscience, a new distinction is made between "wanting" and "liking", which are dissociable features of rewards.

- "Wanting" refers to incentive salience, the feature by which cues in an environment become attention-grabbing and attractive, like a "motivational magnet", pulling a person towards a reward. Incentive salience is mediated by dopamine activity in the mesolimbic pathway of the brain, originating in the ventral tegmental area. This form of "wanting" is usually marked in quotes, distinguishing it from other (more cognitive) forms of desire involving declarative goals or explicit expectations of future outcomes.
- "Liking" refers to the pleasurable (or hedonic) aspect of rewards which are consummatory, tied to activity in hedonic hotspots of the brain.

Research by Helen Fisher and Arthur Aron has now used "attraction" to refer to romantic love, which involves the experience of incentive salience (or "wanting") for a loved one. Romantic love is conceived of as a motivation or drive (a "desire for union with another") which elicits different emotions depending on the situation, rather than being an emotion itself. Fisher's taxonomical theory, independent emotion systems, groups a litany of related concepts together (e.g. "being in love", romantic love, passionate love, obsessive love, infatuation, and limerence) under one label of a mammalian "attraction system"—theorized to have evolved for focusing attention on a preferred mating partner.

The pleasurable (or "liking") aspect of social interactions and romantic love is believed to be related to endogenous opioids, released in hedonic hotspots, according to a long-running theory called the brain opioid theory of social attachment. "Strong liking" for an intimate partner is called companionate love.

The intense, passionate early stage of romantic love is being compared to a behavioral addiction (addiction to a non-substance) where the "substance" is the loved one, because of similar features like craving and obsessionality. In addiction research, the difference between "wanting" and "liking" is used to explain how an addict can compulsively engage in drug-seeking behaviors, despite when taking the drug no longer results in a high or the addiction becomes detrimental to their life. They can also irrationally "want" (i.e. feel compelled towards, in the sense of incentive salience) something which they do not cognitively wish for.

In a way comparable to addiction, people who are in love may "want" a loved person even when interactions with them are not pleasurable. For example, they may want to contact an ex-partner after a rejection, even when that experience will only be painful. It is also possible for a person to be "in love" with somebody they do not like, or who treats them poorly.

=== Partner addiction hypothesis ===
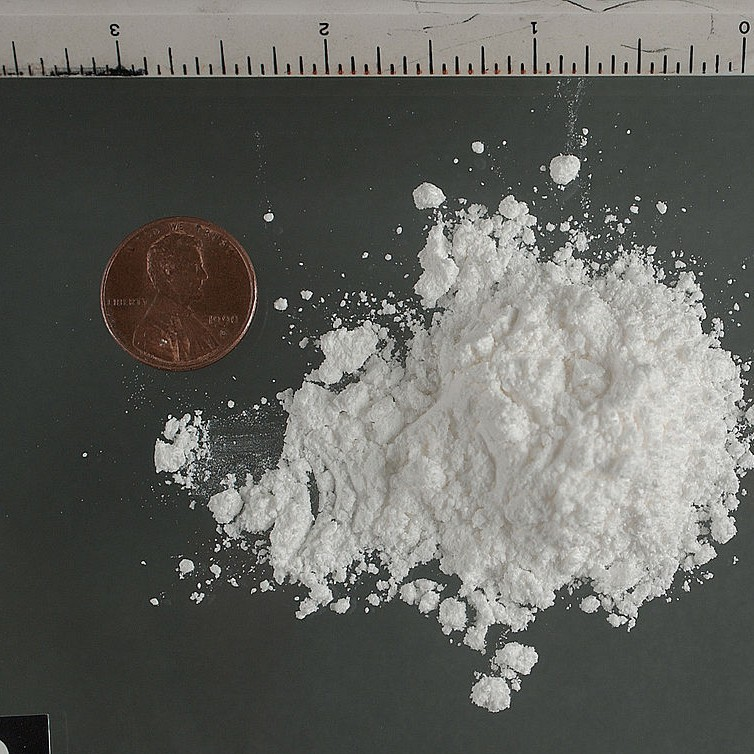

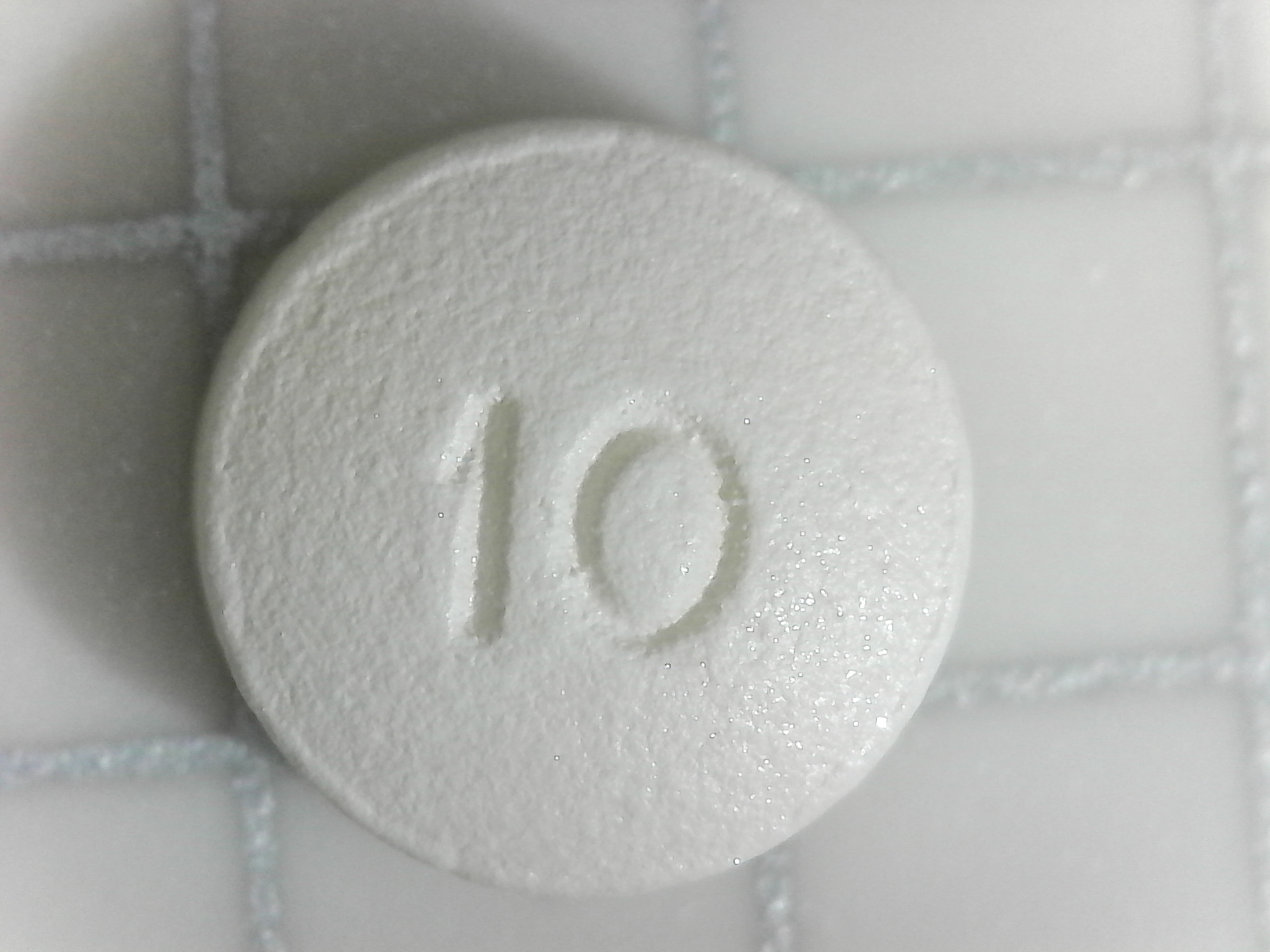
Romantic love has been compared to cocaine and opioid addiction.

Falling in love is believed to follow mechanics similar to addiction, although not identically. One of the major differences is that the trajectories diverge, with the addictive aspects of romantic love tending to disappear over time in an intimate relationship.

By comparison, in a drug addiction, the detrimental aspects magnify with repeated drug use, turning into compulsions, a loss of control and a negative emotional state. It has been speculated that the difference could be related to oxytocin activity—present in romantic love, but not in addiction. Oxytocin seems to ameliorate the effects of drug withdrawal, and it might inhibit the more long-term, excessive effects of addiction. Oxytocin interactions would be more present in reciprocated love, so the comparative lack thereof would also explain some of the more maladaptive features of infatuation (social anxiety, sleep difficulties, etc.) present in cases of fast-arising or unrequited love.

A number of theories have been proposed for how addictions begin and perpetuate. A theory by Wolfram Schultz states that rather than encoding reward per se, dopamine encodes a "reward prediction error" (RPE): the difference between the predicted value of a reward, and the actual value upon receiving it (i.e. whether it was better than, equal to, or worse than expected). In this theory, RPE is part of a mechanism for reinforcement learning, which associates rewards with the cues which predicted them. An example of a reward-predicting cue is a lever used in an experiment, which opens a box with food (the reward). Rewards have to be surprising or unexpected for learning to occur, because (in other words) if there is no error then a current behavior can be maintained and will not change. An fMRI study found that people in relationships experienced brain activity in reward areas consistent with RPE, in response to having expectations about their partners' appraisal of them either validated or violated.

Drugs of abuse (like cocaine) artificially overstimulating dopamine neurons, thus hijacking the mechanism by mimicking an RPE signal which is much stronger than could be produced naturally.

In the theory of "incentive sensitization" developed by Kent Berridge & Terry Robinson, repeated drug use renders the brain hypersensitive to drugs and drug cues, resulting in pathological levels of "wanting" to use drugs. The attribution of incentive salience "wanting" (what is attention-grabbing) follows a Pavlovian learning paradigm (i.e. classical conditioning). While "wanting" can apply innately to some unconditioned stimuli, it can also become attributed to a conditioned stimulus by pairing it with the receipt of a natural (innate) reward, thereby attributing incentive salience by Pavlovian association. When a conditioned stimulus is attributed incentive salience, it becomes a reinforcer too, being attractive and guiding motivated behavior towards reward, once encountered again. This cue-triggered "wanting" (by a conditioned stimulus) can even be so powerful that crack cocaine addicts sometimes "chase ghosts", scrambling for white granules they know aren't cocaine. For a person in love, reminder cues such as letters or photographs can also induce craving.

In the nascent phases of both addiction and attachment, when interactions with the desired object produce rewarding outcomes, dopamine is released in the nucleus accumbens shell which increases the salience of cues predicting the reward. In a "partner addiction" (unlike drugs of abuse), the sensory information being gathered is mostly social, for example, looks, touches, words, scents, body shape and face, or sexual experiences. Salience in response to social stimuli is believed to be modulated by oxytocin, which is projected to reward areas.

These different neurochemical systems interact, as a cooperation between dopamine (incentive salience), opioids (positive rewards) and oxytocin (enhancement from social cues). A positive feedback loop is created, where behavior and predictive cues then become positively reinforced, accumulating positive associations over time.

=== Withdrawal ===
In drug addiction, a shift occurs, first starting with positive reinforcement (of binging and intoxication) in the earlier stages, but then transitioning over time towards negative reinforcement (of avoiding withdrawal). The aversive stress-like effects of this later stage recruit the dynorphin and corticotropin release factor (CRF) systems in the brain. Dynorphin promotes negative affect; CRF causes withdrawal-induced anxiety and craving.

This stress causes CRF to release into the ventral tegmental area and nucleus accumbens shell, motivating the reinstatement of drug use. A similar effect is hypothesized in pair bonds, where stress after separation or social loss motivates a person to return to a partner; however, experiments have not investigated this in humans, only rodents.

== Reinforcement schedules ==
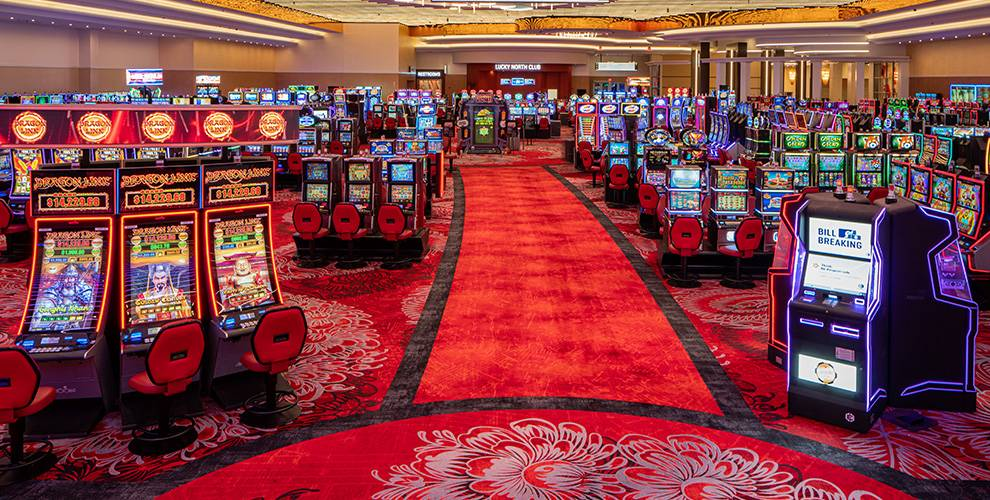

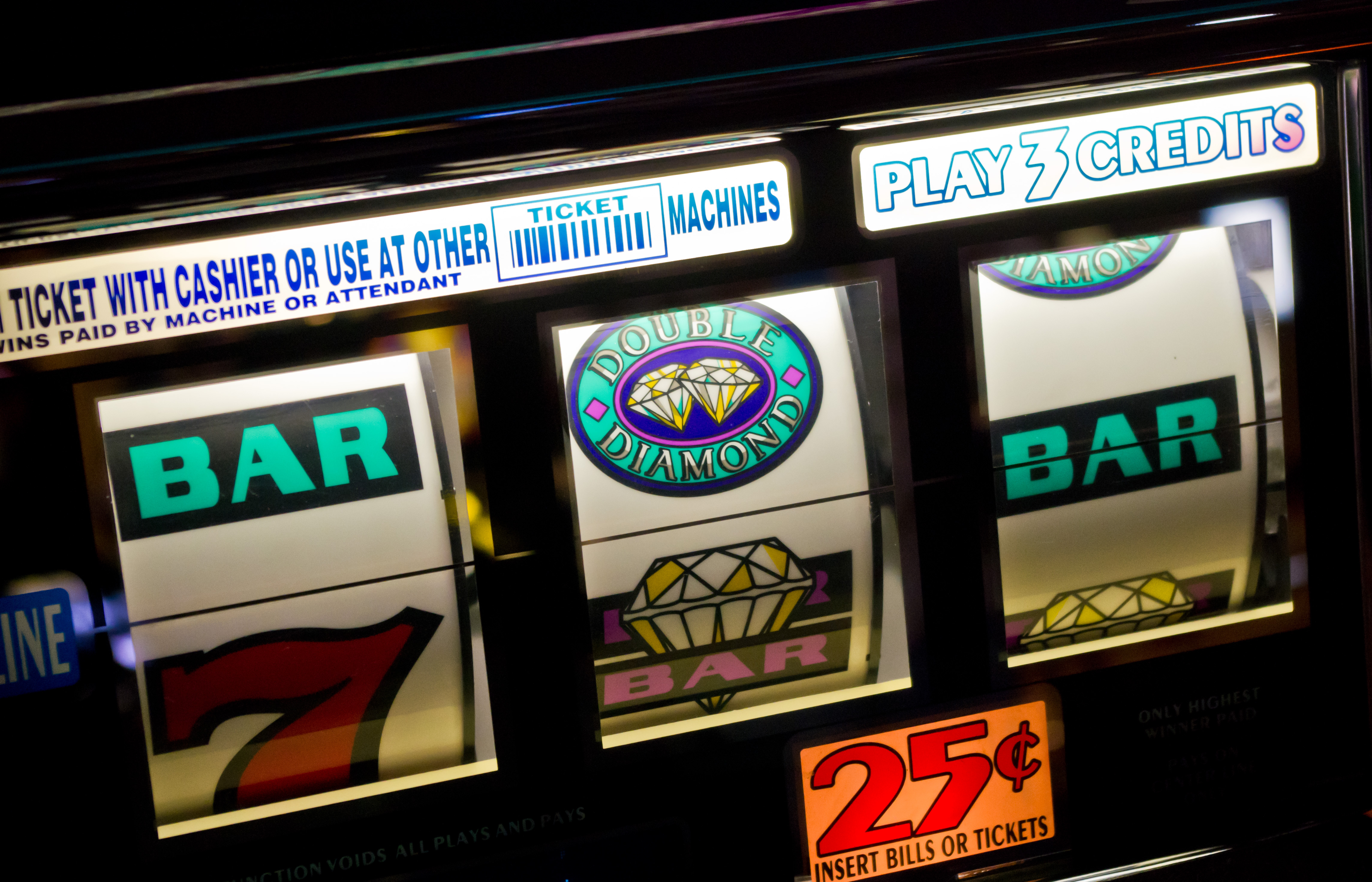
Infatuated love essentially thrives under intermittent reinforcement—also the mechanic a slot machine relies on.

A reinforcement schedule determines when and how often a given behavior is reinforced. Each type of schedule is associated with a different characteristic response. Liking and passionate love are believed to operate primarily under different reinforcement schedules.

If every single response is reinforced, the schedule is called continuous reinforcement (or a fixed ratio of 1). Otherwise, if only some responses are reinforced, then the schedule is called partial or intermittent reinforcement. Schedules affect the rate of learning, as well as how resistant the learned response is to extinction (where the response is weakened or inhibited) after reinforcement is discontinued. With variable-interval and variable-ratio schedules, the resistance to extinction is very high; extinction only occurs very slowly compared to other schedules.

Common reinforcement schedules
Schedule	Example
Continuous	Every response is reinforced
Fixed ratio	Being paid monthly
Fixed interval	Being paid commission, where extra money is made with extra work
Variable interval	Being paid on an irregular interval, as a self-employed person would be
Variable ratio	Gambling

Liking seems to operate primarily under fixed-ratio and fixed-interval schedules, when an individual is fed a more or less "steady diet" of reinforcement.

By comparison, passionate love (infatuation or limerence) operates primarily under variable-ratio and variable-interval schedules. Passionate love is said to essentially thrive under intermittent reinforcement, in situations with only irregular meetings between lovers, or with ambiguous and changing perceptions over whether one's love is returned. Uncertainty seems to magnify cue-triggered incentive salience "wanting". A comparable type of situation is that of a slot machine, where the rewards are designed to be always unpredictable so the gambler cannot understand the pattern. Unable to habituate to the experience, for some people the exhilarating high from the unexpected wins leads to gambling addiction and compulsions. If the machine paid out on a regular interval (so that the rewards were expected), it would not be as exciting.

The phenomenon of "traumatic bonding" in abusive relationships is also believed to rely on intermittent reinforcement, but by alternating good and bad treatment (also called "intermittent maltreatment"). According to Elaine Hatfield, 'Consistency generates little emotion; it is inconsistency that we respond to. If a person always treats us with love and respect, we start to take that person for granted. We like him or her—but "ho hum". Similarly, if a person is always cold and rejecting, we eventually tend to disregard his or her criticisms. [...] What would generate a spark of interest, however, is if our admiring friend suddenly started treating us with contempt—or if our arch enemy started inundating us with kindness.'

=== Attachment style ===
Uncertain reciprocation has also been interpreted in terms of attachment anxiety. Passionate love has long been compared to anxious attachment (although the states are distinct), because of a parallel between preoccupation features. Anxious attachment is believed to increase one's susceptibility to limerence, and worsen the "symptoms".

"Attachment style" refers to differences in attachment-related thoughts and behaviors, relating to the concept of security vs. insecurity. This is split into components of anxiety (worrying the partner is available, attentive and responsive) and avoidance (preference not to rely on others or open up emotionally). Attachment style is considered as an individual difference, but may also be relationship-specific, for example, an avoidant partner can make a normally secure person feel and act anxious (as in the person–situation debate). The formation of attachment style is complicated, starting in childhood and adolescence, but also having a heritable component.

It has been argued that attachment style develops based on the consistency of support given by an attachment figure (e.g. parent or partner), becoming either secure (from responsive support), avoidant (from unresponsive support) or anxious (from inconsistent support). A study investigated the effect of reinforcement schedules on the formation of relationship-specific attachment styles. This study used a negative reinforcement scheme where participants were under threat of an electric shock, which required the help of a supporter (whom they did not know) to prevent. The availability to call a supporter to stop the electric shock was either continuous or variable-ratio, and this variable-ratio support was found to increase approach-related attentional bias towards the supporter (measured with EEG) more than continuous support. It is argued that a negative reinforcement learning process underlies the formation of attachment styles, and that this kind of unpredictability enhances the incentive salience of receiving support, but while also producing an ambivalent dispositional attitude. However, it is cautioned that real-world attachment processes play out in contexts which are different from the experiment—for example, a hug after a bad day.

Under the attachment view, passion wanes as a relationship becomes more secure over time (i.e. as uncertainty is reduced).

=== Duration of romantic love ===
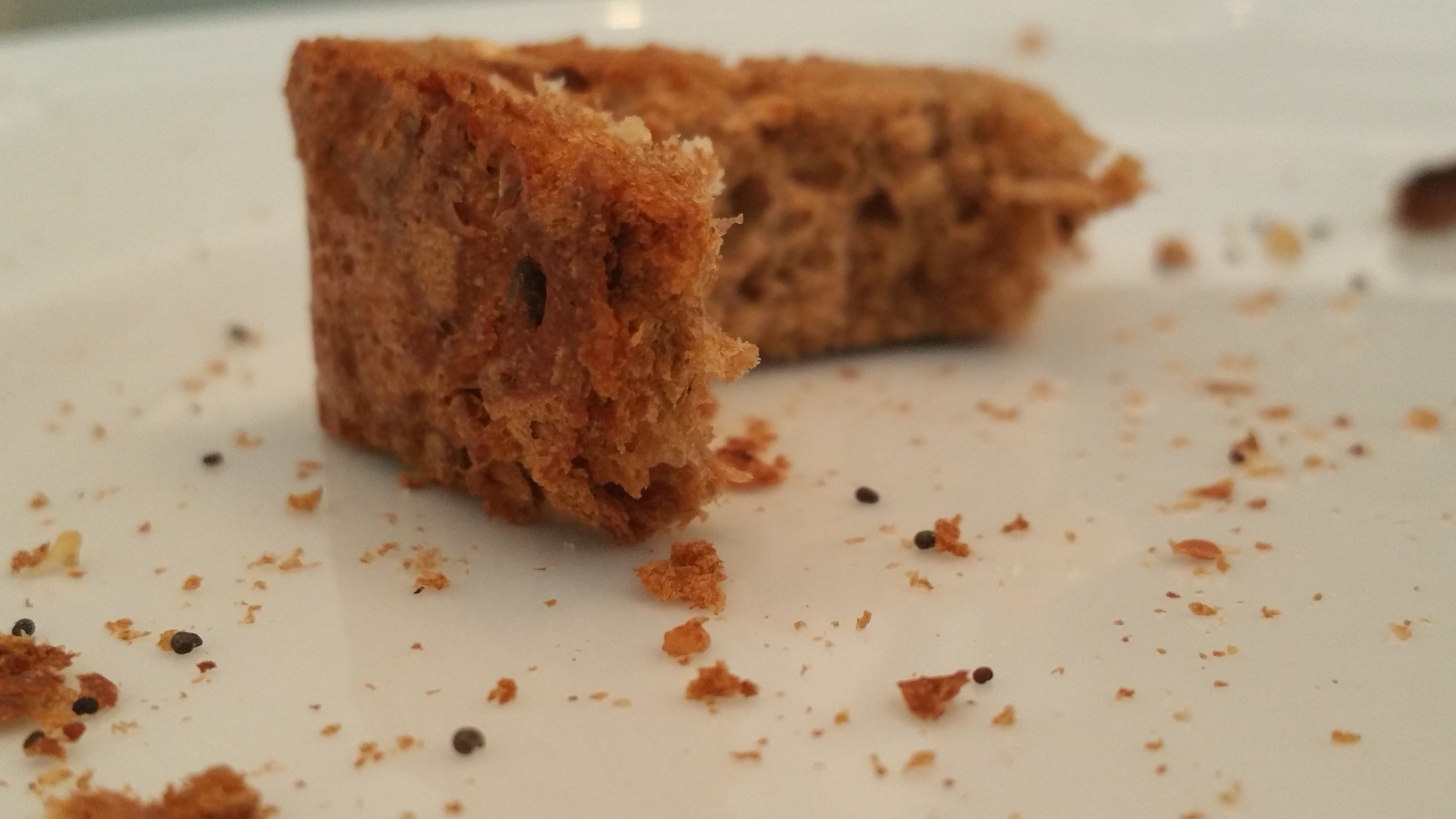
Using intermittent communication to string somebody along without a commitment is called "breadcrumbing".

Desire fades because of a habituation effect on dopamine activity: as a reward is more easily and predictably obtained, the dopamine release in response to reward cues decreases. Because the value of any reward is relative to a person's current comparison level (what they are expecting), as lovers habituate to each other's physical presence and specific behaviors, those behaviors would need to be replaced by new rewarding interactions for a continually romantic experience.

Usually romantic love inside a relationship lasts for just about a year or 18 months. Still, in some cases passionate "romantic ferver" can last much longer, even a lifetime.

The love researcher Helen Fisher recommended in her books that to make feelings of romance last in a relationship, couples should make a point to do novel and exciting things together which stimulate pleasure centers in the brain, and maintain their positive illusions about each other (i.e. over-evaluating positive features, and suspending their negative judgment). Additionally, Fisher has spoken about her "living apart together" arrangement with her own husband (living separately two days a week), saying it's a "great way to have a really long-term romance". In a 2024 podcast, she recalled being "madly in love" with him for nine years.

Brain scans led by Bianca Acevedo using fMRI of people who say they're still "madly in love" in long-term relationships found activations in dopamine-rich reward areas ("wanting"), but also in an area rich with opiate receptors ("liking"). Unlike people who were newly in love, the participants also did not show activity in areas associated with anxiety and fear, and reported less of the obsessional features (intrusive thinking, uncertainty and mood swings) which are a characteristic of infatuation or limerence.

In Acevedo's fMRI experiment, self-expansion was also investigated using inclusion of the other in the self (IOS); IOS scores were shown to correlate with brain activity in the ventral tegmental area, situated in the brain's reward and motivation system, and associated with romantic desire.

Following Acevedo's research, a 2014 study tested whether self-expansion was associated with different types of love in relationships of different durations. This study found that self-expansion was positively associated with a measure of romantic love, regardless of the duration of the relationship (old or new). Self-expansion was also positively associated with a measure of obsession, but the association was stronger in newer relationships and seemed to decrease over time. Finally, there was no association between self-expansion and companionate love, using a measure that "your love for your partner is really just a deep friendship".

Limerence (or lovesickness) can be unending when it's unrequited, for example, in the case of receiving mixed signals, making it difficult to extinguish. Once a relationship occurs, extinction can take place.

== See also ==
- Attachment theory – Psychological ethological theory
- Biology of romantic love – Evolution and neuroscience of romantic love
- Falling in love – Process of developing strong feelings of attachment and love
- Interpersonal attraction – Study of the attraction between people that leads to friendship or romance
- Passionate and companionate love – Two basic love feelings
- Romance – Love focused on feelings
- Theories of love – Psychological and sociological theories
