= Unrequited love =

Love that is not reciprocated

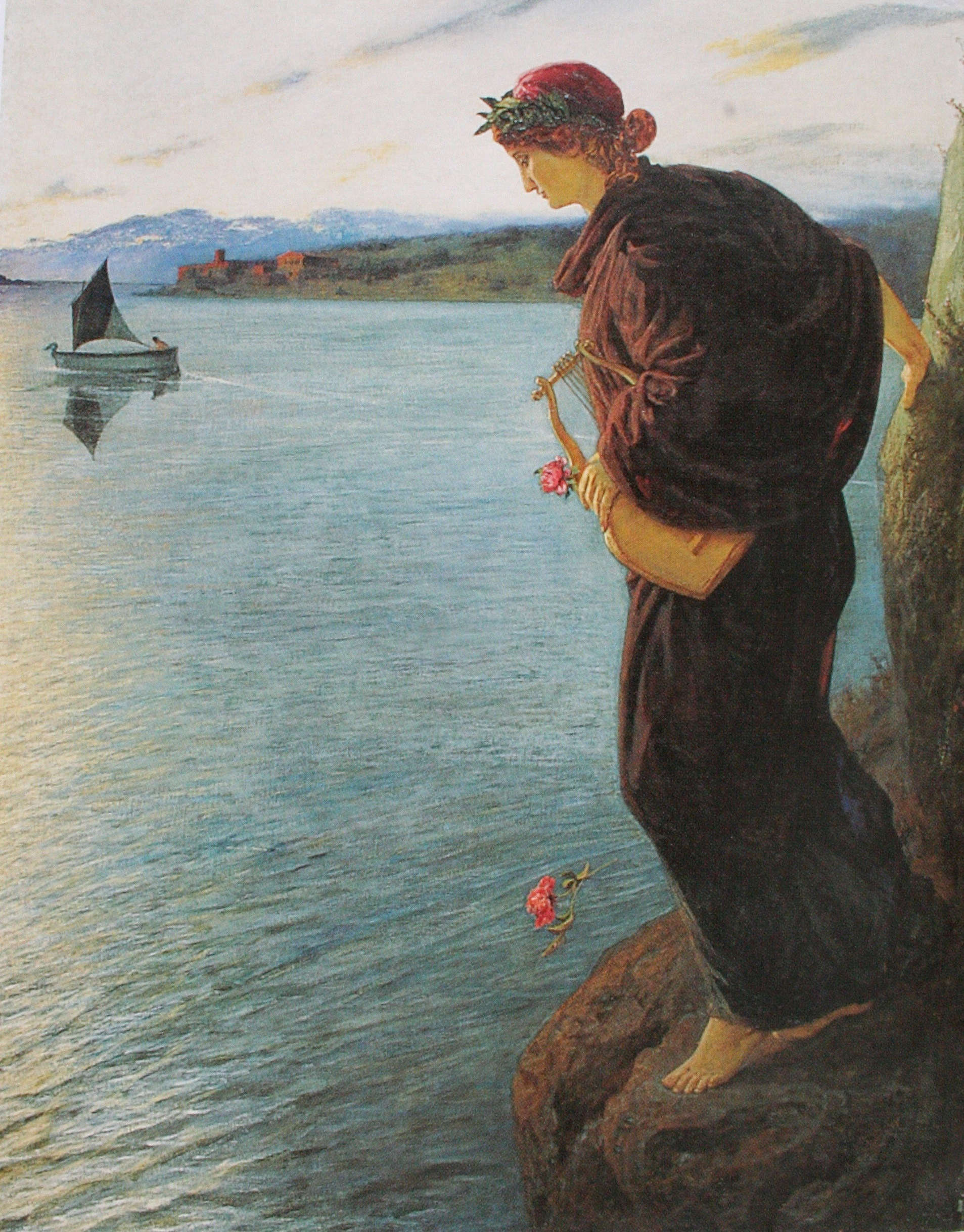
According to legend, the Greek poet Sappho fell from a rock out of unrequited love for the ferryman Phaon. Painting by Ernst Stückelberg, 1897.

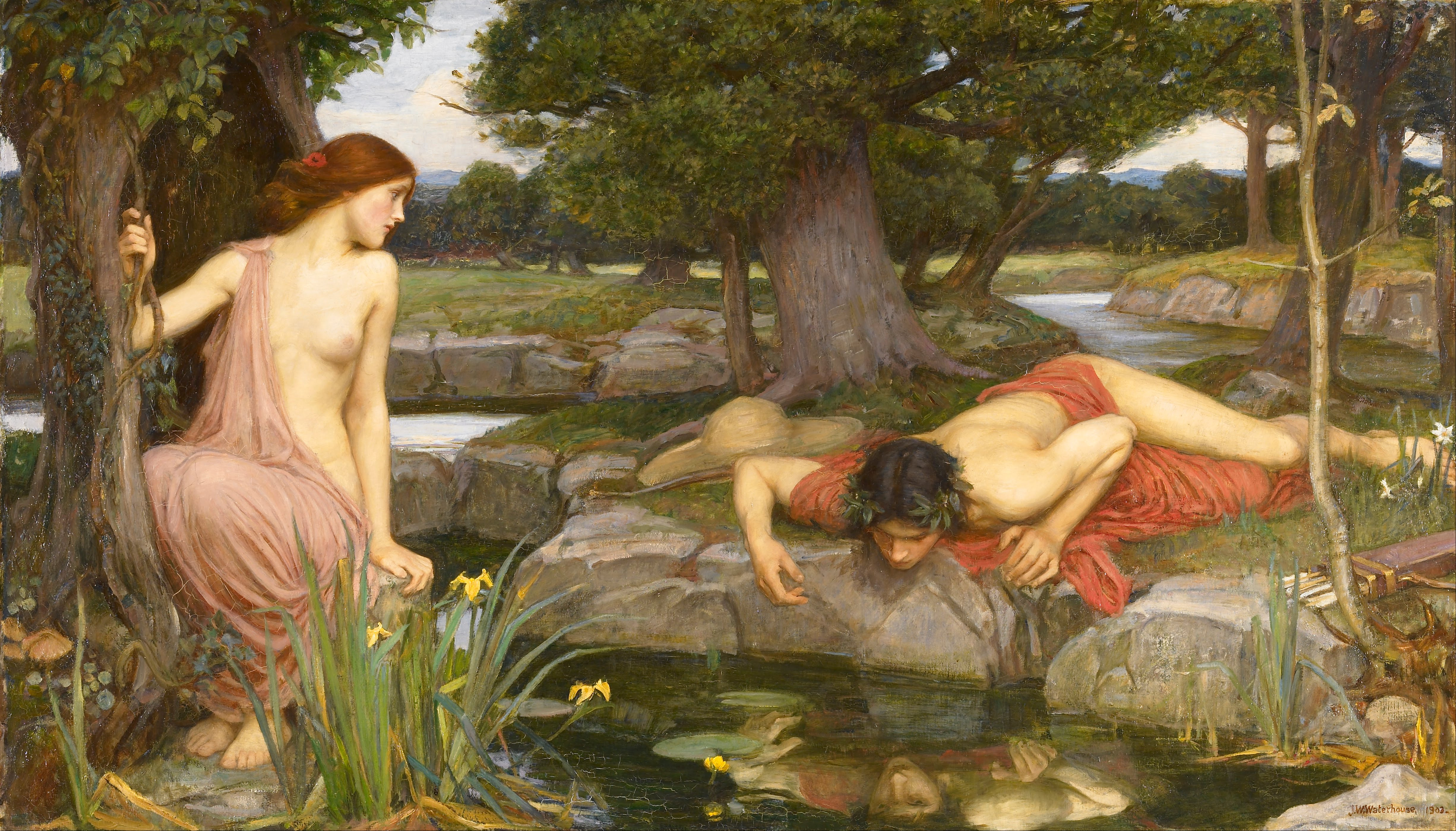
Echo and Narcissus (1903) by John William Waterhouse. The nymph Echo pines for Narcissus, who loves only his own reflection.

Unrequited love is a love which is not reciprocated, one-sided, or more generally unequal, resulting in a yearning for more complete love. This might occur inside a relationship with unequal love, commitment, or effort between partners, or it might occur in a context where little or no relationship exists between the participants (even as in parasocial love for a celebrity). Lovesickness is the resulting mental state.

Unrequited love generally pertains to the romantic, passionate, infatuated, obsessive, or limerent variety of love (also called "being in love"): a state which is conceptualized as a motivation or drive. This state is commonly distinguished from other types of love: companionate love (or attachment) and compassionate love (or agape). Reciprocal love is called "redamancy".

According to the psychologist Dorothy Tennov, the state of being in love is distinguishable from the many other uses of the word "love" (such as caring or concern), for: "Affection and fondness have no 'objective'; they simply exist as feelings in which you are disposed toward actions to which the recipient might or might not respond." The psychiatrist Eric Berne wrote that "Some say one-sided love is better than none, but like half a loaf of bread, it is likely to grow hard and moldy sooner."

Unequal (unrequited) love is more common than equal love, according to a study of students. In the ideal scenario, passionate or romantic love would progress with two people meeting, and developing a mutual attraction. This would culminate in a sudden rush of emotion, the escalation of intimacy and commitment, and increasingly more time spent together. However, this does not always happen, and often intense romantic love is one-sided.

== Interdependence ==
Rather than being a specific emotion itself, romantic love is believed to be a motivation or drive which elicits different emotions depending on the situation: positive feelings when things go well, and negative feelings when awry. Reciprocated love may elicit feelings of joy, ecstasy, or fulfillment, for example, but unrequited love or separation may elicit feelings of sadness, anxiety, or despair.

The feeling of romantic love may also be either pleasant or unpleasant, regardless of the intensity level. One of Dorothy Tennov's interview participants recalls being in love this way: "When I felt [Barry] loved me, I was intensely in love and deliriously happy; when he seemed rejecting, I was still intensely in love, only miserable beyond words."

It is useful then to think of unrequited love in terms of interdependence theory, because the emotions felt and other outcomes are contingent on the actions of the people involved: the would-be lover's experience depends on the actions of the target of their love (the rejector), and vice versa.

Among theorists of love, different perspectives have been given on whether the giving or receiving of love is more important. For example, Erich Fromm emphasized the giving and "the art of loving" as essential to happiness, whereas Carl Rogers emphasized the receiving of unconditional positive regard. Experiences of unrequited love, however, support the idea that neither giving nor receiving by itself is sufficient; rather, the mutual experience of reciprocated love is required for happiness.

== Prevalence ==
Unrequited love is common among young adults. A study by Roy Baumeister and Sarah Stillwell found that 92.8% of participants reported at least one "powerful or moderate" experience of unrequited love in the past 5 years. A different study found 63% had a "huge crush" at least once in the past 2 years (but not letting the person know), and unrequited love was four times more frequent than equal love.

Another study found that 20% had experienced unrequited love more than 5 times, according to a definition of "having one's emotions on a roller coaster, finding it difficult to concentrate, and thinking constantly about the person with whom you are in love. The person is said to have the power to produce extreme highs and lows of emotion in you, depending on how he or she acts towards you."

== Reasons for unrequited love ==
Some people have a tendency to fall in love with people who are much more desirable than themselves, so their love tends to be unrequited; Roy Baumeister calls this kind of mismatch "falling upward". Research shows that relationships tend to be successful when the couple is more or less even in attractiveness, so Baumeister suggests that a mismatched relationship may be doomed. According to the "matching hypothesis", while a person might prefer a relationship with an extremely attractive person, they would rather not run the risk of rejection either, so relationships tend to be limited to partners who are similarly attractive. The matching of similar traits in marriage is also called "homogamy"; dissimilarity is "heterogamy".

Unrequited love may flourish in platonic friendships due to the already established relationship. Intimacy is the core of a love relationship, but the feelings may grow in only one person. Another type of scenario where unrequited love may occur is the early stage of a romantic relationship, where after dating for a time, one person's feelings begin to flourish, while the other wishes to discontinue the relation. This may be confusing for both parties, because of the reinforcement from initial reciprocation, and because rejectors may lack insight into their absence of growing desire despite some initial interest.

Those with an anxious attachment style are slightly more prone to unrequited love than other attachment styles, and their fear of abandonment can also drive people away.

Another general factor is the misreading of the beloved's nonverbal communications, mixed messages or other responses. Such misreadings are believed to create a partial reinforcement schedule which makes the feeling difficult to extinguish, prolonging the duration.

=== Self-expansion ===
The self-expansion model of interpersonal relationships is a variant of the reward theory of attraction which proposes that people have a basic motivation to expand their physical influence, cognitive complexity, social or bodily identity, and self-awareness, and that the psychological reward from falling in love is whatever creates this "expansion of the self". Relationships are an important area for self-expansion, via a process called "inclusion of the other in the self", where aspects of a partner (e.g. traits, skills, attitudes, resources, abilities, and worldviews) are incorporated into one's own self concept.

The theory is used to explain unrequited love, because falling in love may be a desirable experience even when no relationship occurs. Unrequited love may occur then if the reward from self-expansion exceeds the relative probability of reciprocation.

=== Readiness ===
A "readiness" to enter a relationship is identified as an antecedent to falling in love, originally emphasized by the psychoanalyst Theodor Reik. Readiness is also likened to the idea of being "in love with love". The process of falling in love can be seen as an interplay between both this readiness (on the one hand), and a potential partner's appeal (on the other hand). Sometimes readiness can be so intense that a person falls in love with somebody who only has a minimal appeal. With lower readiness, the specific set of partner characteristics becomes more important.

Reik believed that unhappy people tend to be the most vulnerable to love, elaborating on a claim by Sigmund Freud that "happy people never make fantasies, only unsatisfied ones do". Elaine Hatfield concurs, saying "the greater our need, the more grandiose our fantasies". When one is most dissatisfied, their idealization is said to become an entire fantasy structure mixed up with reality, draped around the loved one; hence, according to clinical theories, romantic love tends to actually grow from one's unfulfilled needs, deficiencies, or dissatisfaction with oneself. Abraham Maslow called such love "deficiency-love", for the same reason, and contrasted it with "being-love": what one ought to aspire to in his view, but few experience.

An experiment by Hatfield found that college women whose self-esteem was lowered by negative feedback liked a man who asked them out on a date more than those women whose self-esteem was raised by positive feedback. The finding has been related as fitting a drive-reduction interpretation of reinforcement, that is, liking was greater for those that needed the ego boost of a potentially positive experience. Another important factor to readiness is loneliness. Phillip Shaver & Cindy Hazan argued that if people have many unmet social needs and are unaware, then a sign somebody is interested in them may become magnified into something quite unrealistic.

Readiness is described as heightening one's susceptibility to limerence—the kind of passionate love (or "all-absorbing" infatuated love) which is commonly unrequited, and felt for somebody unreachable.

== Rejectors ==
Roy Baumeister has observed an important difference in the possible outcomes of unrequited love, when analyzing the perspectives of the would-be lover and rejector separately. Even though in some cases, the would-be lover can experience more intense suffering than the rejector is likely to experience, the possible outcomes for the would-be lover also include the opposite extreme: the mutual bliss of living happily ever after, if love was reciprocated. By comparison, the possible outcomes for the rejector are all bad, assuming he or she cannot come to love the other. Baumeister calls the situation a "high-stakes gamble to the would-be lover", but a "no-win situation for the rejector".

While the perspective of the would-be lover is made familiar by our culture through popular media, the rejector's side is largely ignored, incomplete, or inaccurate. In fact, Baumeister's research found that an object of unrequited desire experiences unpleasant emotions as well—like anxiety, frustration, and guilt—and these were mentioned about a third more often in accounts by rejectors than pursuers.

Would-be lovers and rejectors often perpetuate the situation with a "conspiracy of silence", because both parties want to avoid the painful communication. Would-be lovers do not want to hear the rejection, and rejectors do not want to cause the would-be lover to suffer. As a result, rejectors tend to soften the message with compliments or only vague reasoning, and would-be lovers tend to perceive the message as unserious. Dorothy Tennov advocates in her discussion of limerence that an individual who is the object of such an unwanted attraction ought to give the clearest possible rejection, rather than ambiguities such as "I like you as a friend, but...".

== Consequences ==
=== Advantages ===
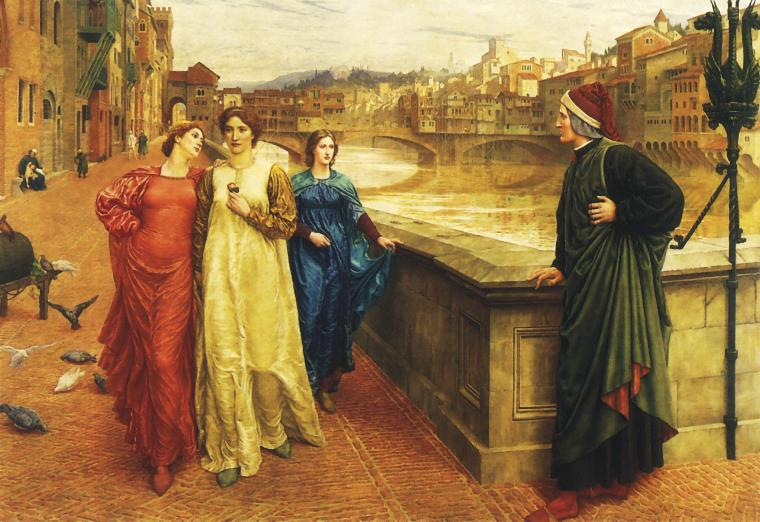
Dante looks longingly at Beatrice Portinari (in yellow) as she passes by him with Lady Vanna (in red) in Dante and Beatrice, by Henry Holiday

Rejection has been the inspiration behind famous literary creations, such as Astrophil and Stella (Sir Philip Sidney), Amoretti (Edmund Spenser), and many of Shakespeare's sonnets. Maurice Evans, a professor at the University of Exeter, calls such works "poetry of frustration".

Eric Berne opined that "The man who is loved by a woman is lucky indeed, but the one to be envied is he who loves, however little he gets in return. How much greater is Dante gazing at Beatrice than Beatrice walking by him in apparent disdain." Dante's lifelong unrequited love for Beatrice is considered a historical example of limerence, in which the obsessed individual spends much of their time fantasizing about the love object.

Participants in Baumeister's study claimed to have learned more about themselves from their experience with unrequited love, but this appears to have been largely about the futility of one-sided passion, with a new caution formed about love and relationships.

=== Disadvantages ===
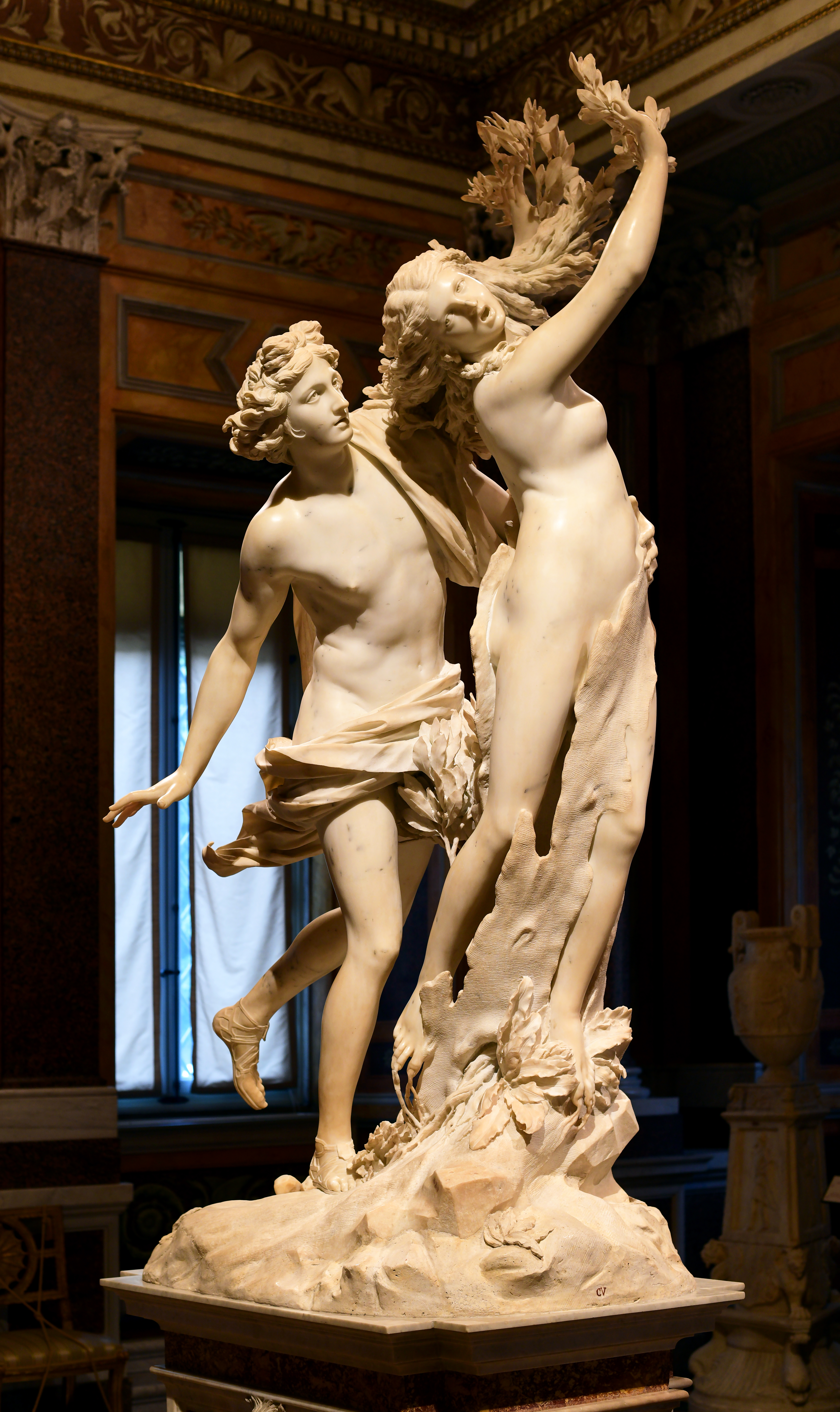
Apollo and Daphne, by Gian Lorenzo Bernini, depicts Daphne turning into a tree to escape the pursuit of Apollo, after an arrow shot by Eros made him fall in love with her

Unrequited love can be destructive to the emotional well-being of the people involved, and to the interpersonal bond between them.

One consequence of unrequited love would be attempted suicide on the part of the lover. In Dorothy Tennov's research survey on being in love, half of an apparently normal group of college students reported depression about a love affair, 42% had been severely depressed, and almost a third were often depressed; 17% had often thought of committing suicide, and 11% (more than 1 in 10) claimed to have seriously attempted suicide. Unrequited love has been described as a clinical syndrome.

Baumeister's findings indicated that rejectors tended to look back with a desire to erase the incident from their memories; in many cases, they had lost a special friendship. (By comparison, would-be lovers actually tended to look back with a fondness on the memories—what Baumeister calls "the irony of retrospect".)

Stalking is another possible consequence of unrequited love. A 1999 study found that stalkers who were pursuing a relationship with their victim could be categorized as being either ex-partners, delusional (erotomanic or otherwise), socially or intellectually incompetent, and having personality disorders. A preoccupation with the fantasy of a special and unique relationship with the object of one's love is normal in the early part of romance or infatuation; however, in the case of the stalker, where pathological narcissism is an issue, the humiliation of rejection is expressed through rage and pursuit of the victim.

According to J. Reid Meloy, "Violent behavior toward self or others as the denoument of unrequited love is as old as antiquity."

== Remedies ==
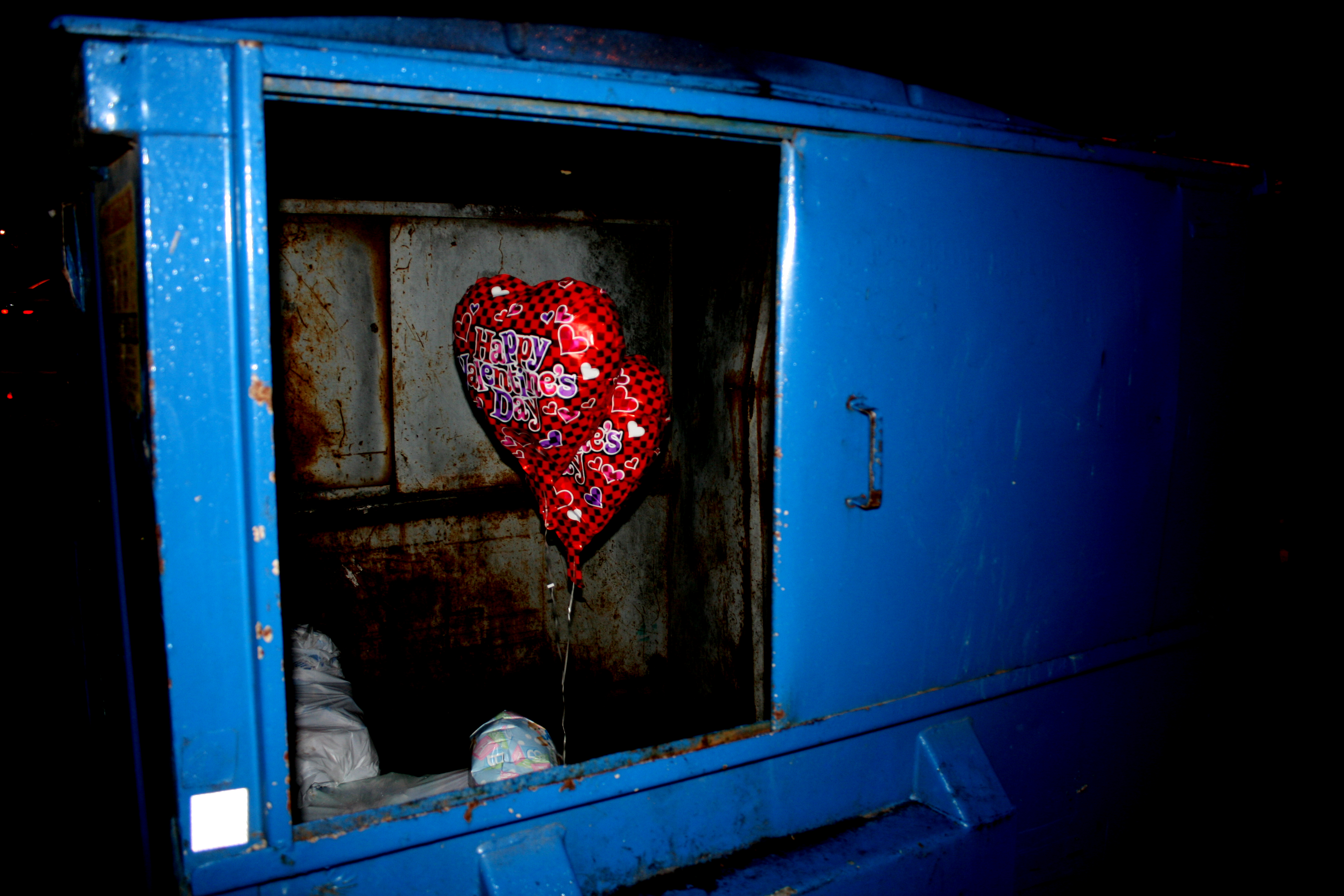
A wrapped, unopened Valentine's Day gift with heart-shaped balloons discarded in a dumpster

Based on the addiction theory of romantic love, Helen Fisher and colleagues recommend that rejected lovers remove all reminders of their beloved, such as letters or photos, and avoid contact with the rejecting partner. Reminders can cause cravings which prolong recovery. They also suggest that positive contact with friends could reduce cravings. Rejected lovers should stay busy to distract themselves, and engage in self-expanding activities.

In Remedia Amoris (c. 1 CE), the Roman poet Ovid gave advice on how to remedy unrequited love. Ovid's suggestions include travel, teetotalism, bucolic pursuits, and avoiding love poets.

== Neuroscience ==
In 2010, Helen Fisher, Arthur Aron and colleagues published their fMRI experiment investigating which areas of the brain might be active in recently rejected lovers. Participants had been in a relationship with their ex-partner for an average of 21 months, and then were post-rejection for an average of 63 days at the time of the experiment. These participants reported spending more than 85% of their waking hours thinking of their rejector, reported a lack of emotional control, and exhibited unhappiness, with sometimes more extreme emotions like depression, anger, and even paranoia in pre- and post-interviews.

Similar to other fMRI experiments of people in love, the scan while looking at a photograph of the rejecting partner showed activations in dopaminergic reward system areas, like the ventral tegmental area and nucleus accumbens. These activations were also stronger than in a previous experiment of participants who were happily in love. The active nucleus accumbens, prefrontal cortex, and orbitofrontal cortex have been associated with assessing one's gains and losses, and active areas of the insular cortex and anterior cingulate cortex have been involved with physical pain and pain regulation (respectively) in other studies.

== Cultural references ==
The Rose of the World

Bow down, archangels, in your dim abode:
Before you were, or any hearts to beat,
Weary and kind one lingered by His seat;
He made the world to be a grassy road
Before her wandering feet.

— W. B. Yeats (Note: W. B. Yeats has been called "the last romantic" and "perhaps also the last courtly lover"; his poem The Rose of the World is said to be a projection of Maud Gonne's beauty, written after an experience he had walking all over the cliffs of Howth with her one day.)

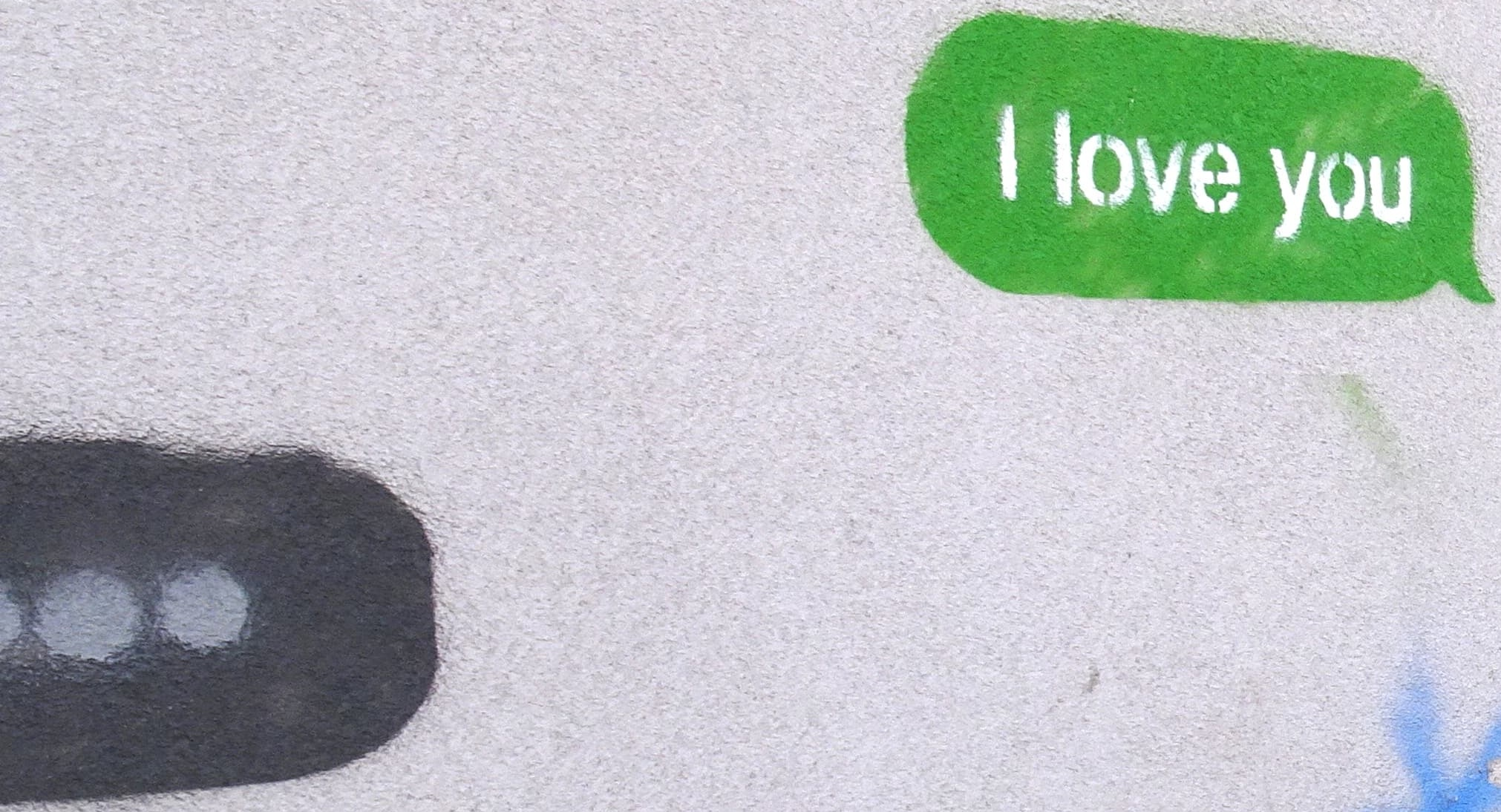
Mural of a text message reading "I love you" and an ellipsis as a typing awareness indicator on the left

=== Western ===
- Unrequited love is one theme explored by the comic strip Peanuts. Charlie Brown's unrequited crush on the "little red-haired girl" was inspired by Peanuts' creator Charles M. Schulz's own unrequited love for a woman named Donna Mae Johnson. Schultz drew cartoons in her appointment books every morning so she would think of him; however, she chose another man.
- William Yeats' unrequited love for Maud Gonne was the inspiration for many of his poems. Gonne is reported to have told Yeats that "you make beautiful poetry out of what you call your unhappiness, and are happy in that. [...] Poets should never marry. The world should thank me for not marrying you."
- Unrequited love is a central theme in Remembrance of Things Past, a novel by Proust. According to Robert Pippin, the novel suggests the idea that unrequited love is the only sustainable love, with the powerful desire of romantic love being formed under the influence of idealization and fantasy. Love's intensity would diminish as a relationship becomes habit. Pippin states that unrequited love could be "a figure of sorts for the condition of modernity itself"; society itself "looks to be little more than a tissue of lies, evasions, delusions, vain pretensions, a hall of mirrors for social posturing".

=== Eastern ===
- A cross-cultural survey in the early 1990s found that Chinese people thought Western ideas about love were inaccurate, and that Chinese participants linked "passionate love" to concepts like "unrequited love", "infatuation", "sorrow" and "nostalgia". Many seemed to as much want to "fall in love" as to develop a mental illness.

== See also ==
- Anteros – Ancient Greek god of returned love
- Breakup – Termination of an intimate relationship
- Broken heart – Intense stress or pain one feels at experiencing longing
- Erotomania – Romantic delusional disorder
- Friend zone – Inability to move from a platonic relationship into a romantic one
- Hanahaki disease – Fictional disease caused by unrequited love
- Infatuation – Intense, irrational attraction
- Limerence – Love madness or intense infatuation
- Lovesickness – Mental state of unfulfilled or unrequited love
- Love triangle – Romantic relationship involving three people
- Obsessive love – Possessiveness and inability to accept rejection
- Parasocial interaction – Type of psychological relationship
- Romance – Love focused on feelings
- Romantic love (mental state) – Mental state of being in love
- Simp – Slang for sycophancy
- Tsundere – Term for a character development process
- Unconditional love – Concept of love without conditions
