= Falling in love =

Process of developing strong feelings of attachment and love

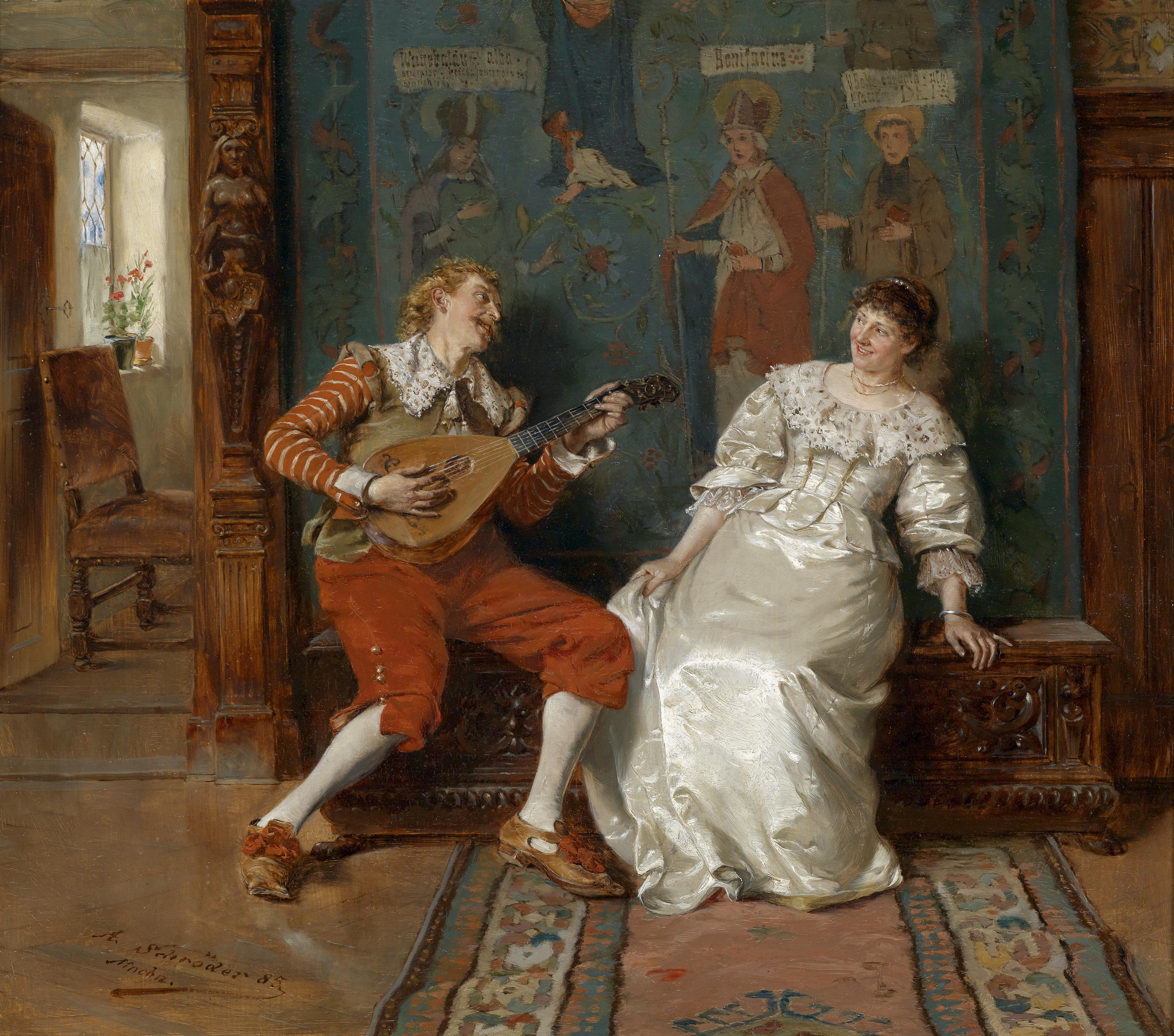
Albert Schröder - Musikalische Unterhaltung (circa 1885)

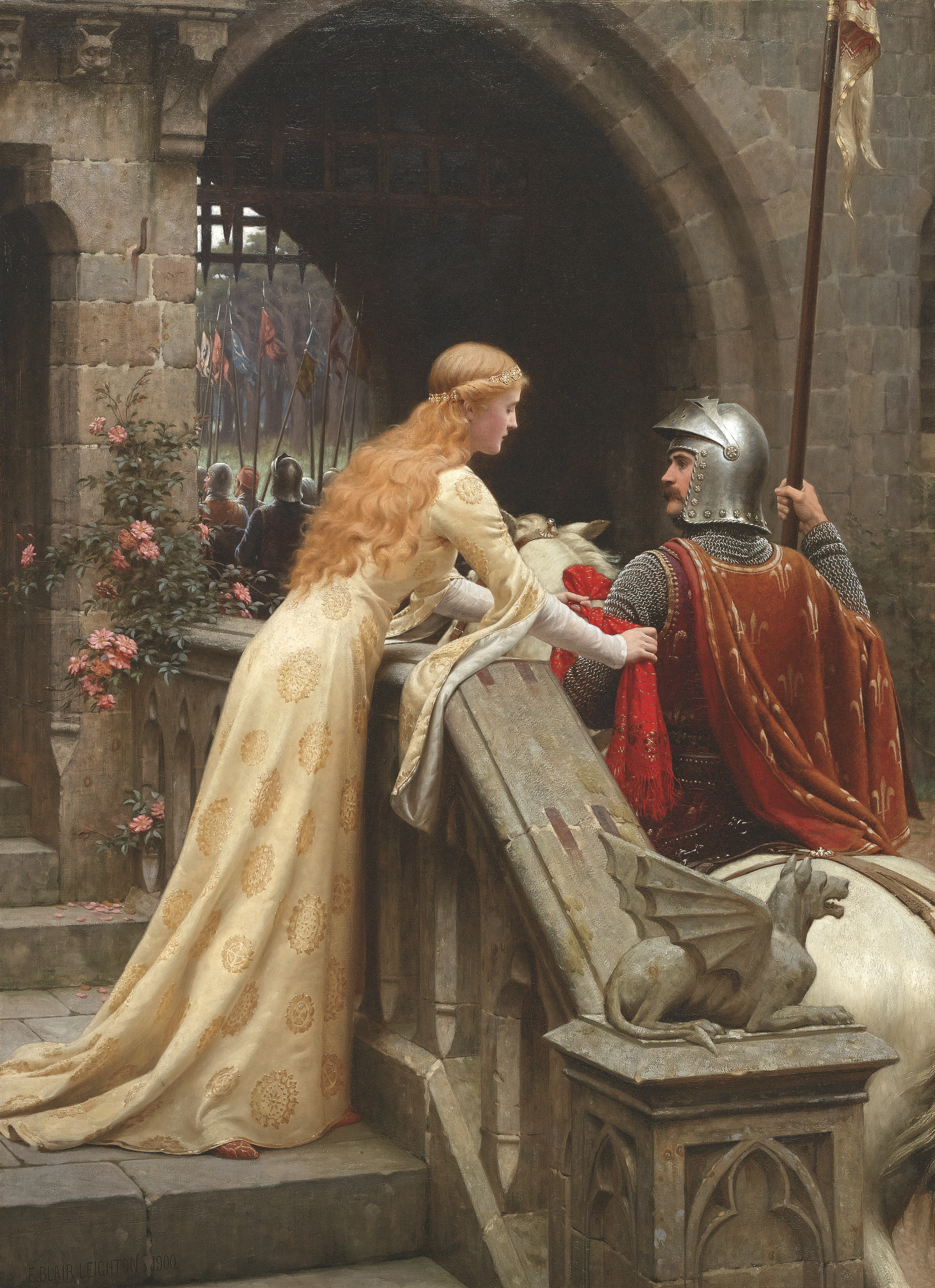
God Speed by English artist Edmund Leighton, 1900: depicting an armored knight departing for war and leaving behind his lover

Falling in love is the development of strong feelings of attachment and love, usually towards another person.

The term is metaphorical, emphasizing that the process, like the physical act of falling, is sudden, uncontrollable and leaves the lover in a vulnerable state, similar to "fall ill" or "fall into a trap".

It may also reflect the importance of the lower brain centers in the process, which can lead the rational, accounting brain to conclude (in John Cleese's words) that "this falling in love routine is very bizarre.... It borders on the occult".

== Factors ==
According to Albert Einstein, gravity cannot be held responsible for people "falling" in love.

=== Mental ===
"Factors known to contribute strongly to falling in love include proximity, similarity, reciprocity, and physical attractiveness", while at the same time, the process involves a re-activation of old childhood patterns of attachment. Deep-set psychological parallels between two people may also underpin their pairing-bonding, which can thus border on mere narcissistic identification.

The psychoanalyst Adam Phillips has described how illusions that occurred when falling in love resulted in disappointment when learning the truth about a lover.

=== Chemical ===
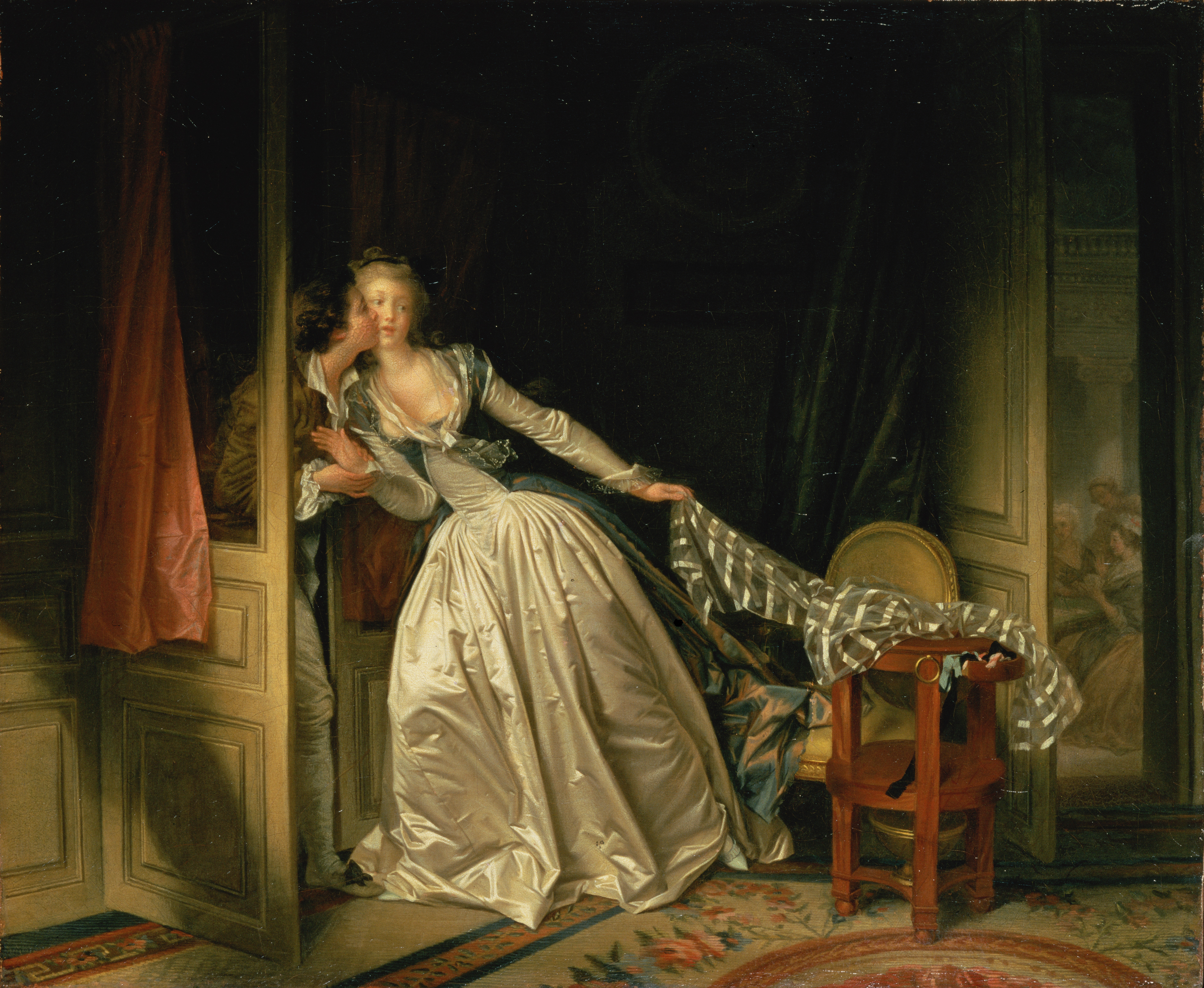
Jean-Honoré Fragonard—The Stolen Kiss (circa late 1780s)

Two chemical reactions associated with falling in love are increases in oxytocin and vasopressin; and Elisabeth Young-Bruehl has suggested that "when we fall in love we are falling into a stream of naturally occurring amphetamines running through the emotional centres of our very own brains". With regard to sociobiology, it is stressed that mate selection cannot be left to the head alone and must require complex neurochemical support.

Critics of such Neo-Darwinism point out that over-simplistic physical arguments obscure the way sexual passion often leads not to secure attachment but to attachments thwarted, as well as the sheer frightening difficulties of all falling in love.

Biologist Jeremy Griffith suggests that people fall in love in order to abandon themselves to the dream of an ideal state (being one free of the human condition).

=== Readiness ===
A "readiness" to enter a relationship is identified as an antecedent to falling in love, originally emphasized by the psychoanalyst Theodor Reik. Readiness is also likened to the idea of being "in love with love". The process of falling in love can be seen as an interplay between both this readiness (on the one hand), and a potential partner's appeal (on the other hand). Sometimes readiness can be so intense that a person falls in love with somebody who only has a minimal appeal. With lower readiness, the specific set of partner characteristics becomes more important.

Reik believed that unhappy people tend to be the most vulnerable to love, elaborating on a claim by Sigmund Freud that "happy people never make fantasies, only unsatisfied ones do". Elaine Hatfield concurs, saying "the greater our need, the more grandiose our fantasies". When one is most dissatisfied, their idealization is said to become an entire fantasy structure mixed up with reality, draped around the loved one; hence, according to clinical theories, romantic love tends to actually grow from one's unfulfilled needs, deficiencies, or dissatisfaction with oneself. Abraham Maslow called such love "deficiency-love", for the same reason, and contrasted it with "being-love": what one ought to aspire to in his view, but few experience.

An experiment by Hatfield found that college women whose self-esteem was lowered by negative feedback liked a man who asked them out on a date more than those women whose self-esteem was raised by positive feedback. The finding has been related as fitting a drive-reduction interpretation of reinforcement, that is, liking was greater for those that needed the ego boost of a potentially positive experience. Another important factor to readiness is loneliness. Phillip Shaver & Cindy Hazan argued that if people have many unmet social needs and are unaware, then a sign somebody is interested in them may become magnified into something quite unrealistic.

Readiness is described as heightening one's susceptibility to limerence—the kind of passionate love (or "all-absorbing" infatuated love) which is commonly unrequited, and felt for somebody unreachable.

== Timing ==
Stendhal charted the timing of falling in love in terms of what he called crystallization—a first period of crystallization (of some six weeks) which often involves obsessive brooding and the idealization of the other via a coating of desire; a period of doubt; and then a final crystallization of love.

Empirical studies suggest that men fall in love earlier than women and women are quicker to fall out of love than men.

== Neuroscience ==
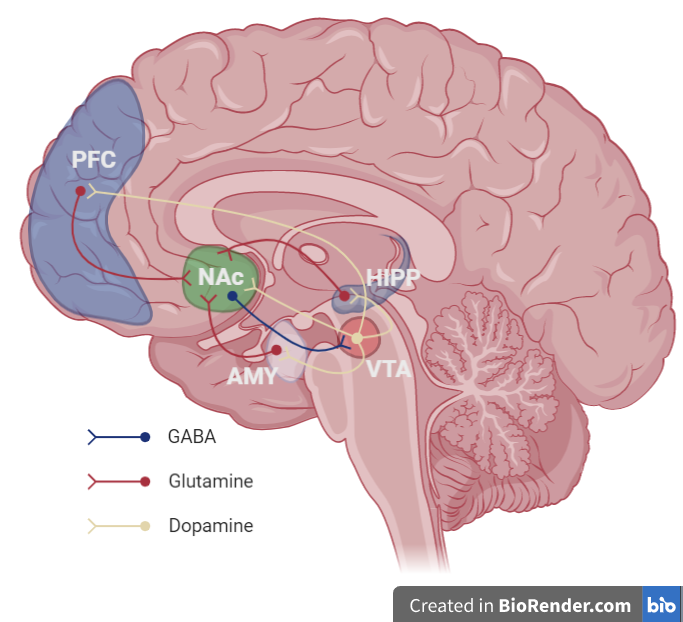
Dopamine is produced in the ventral tegmental area (VTA) of the brain, and projected to the nucleus accumbens (NAc). Dopamine activity in the NAc is key to the attribution of salience.

Falling in love is believed to follow mechanics similar to addiction, although not identically. One of the major differences is that the trajectories diverge, with the addictive aspects of romantic love tending to disappear over time in an intimate relationship.

By comparison, in a drug addiction, the detrimental aspects magnify with repeated drug use, turning into compulsions, a loss of control and a negative emotional state. It has been speculated that the difference could be related to oxytocin activity—present in romantic love, but not in addiction. Oxytocin seems to ameliorate the effects of drug withdrawal, and it might inhibit the more long-term, excessive effects of addiction. Oxytocin interactions would be more present in reciprocated love, so the comparative lack thereof would also explain some of the more maladaptive features of infatuation (social anxiety, sleep difficulties, etc.) present in cases of fast-arising or unrequited love.

A number of theories have been proposed for how addictions begin and perpetuate. A theory by Wolfram Schultz states that rather than encoding reward per se, dopamine encodes a "reward prediction error" (RPE): the difference between the predicted value of a reward, and the actual value upon receiving it (i.e. whether it was better than, equal to, or worse than expected). In this theory, RPE is part of a mechanism for reinforcement learning, which associates rewards with the cues which predicted them. An example of a reward-predicting cue is a lever used in an experiment, which opens a box with food (the reward). Rewards have to be surprising or unexpected for learning to occur, because (in other words) if there is no error then a current behavior can be maintained and will not change. An fMRI study found that people in relationships experienced brain activity in reward areas consistent with RPE, in response to having expectations about their partners' appraisal of them either validated or violated.

Drugs of abuse (like cocaine) artificially overstimulating dopamine neurons, thus hijacking the mechanism by mimicking an RPE signal which is much stronger than could be produced naturally.

In the theory of "incentive sensitization" developed by Kent Berridge & Terry Robinson, repeated drug use renders the brain hypersensitive to drugs and drug cues, resulting in pathological levels of "wanting" to use drugs. The attribution of incentive salience "wanting" (what is attention-grabbing) follows a Pavlovian learning paradigm (i.e. classical conditioning). While "wanting" can apply innately to some unconditioned stimuli, it can also become attributed to a conditioned stimulus by pairing it with the receipt of a natural (innate) reward, thereby attributing incentive salience by Pavlovian association. When a conditioned stimulus is attributed incentive salience, it becomes a reinforcer too, being attractive and guiding motivated behavior towards reward, once encountered again. This cue-triggered "wanting" (by a conditioned stimulus) can even be so powerful that crack cocaine addicts sometimes "chase ghosts", scrambling for white granules they know aren't cocaine. For a person in love, reminder cues such as letters or photographs can also induce craving.

In the nascent phases of both addiction and attachment, when interactions with the desired object produce rewarding outcomes, dopamine is released in the nucleus accumbens shell which increases the salience of cues predicting the reward. In a "partner addiction" (unlike drugs of abuse), the sensory information being gathered is mostly social, for example, looks, touches, words, scents, body shape and face, or sexual experiences. Salience in response to social stimuli is believed to be modulated by oxytocin, which is projected to reward areas.

These different neurochemical systems interact, as a cooperation between dopamine (incentive salience), opioids (positive rewards) and oxytocin (enhancement from social cues). A positive feedback loop is created, where behavior and predictive cues then become positively reinforced, accumulating positive associations over time.

== See also ==
- Attachment theory – Psychological ethological theory
- Biology of romantic love – Evolution and neuroscience of romantic love
- Crystallization (love) – Process of falling in love
- Infatuation – Intense, irrational attraction
- Limerence – Love madness or intense infatuation
- Love at first sight – Falling in long-lasting love on first sight
- Lovesickness – Mental state of unfulfilled or unrequited love
- Passionate and companionate love – Two basic love feelings
- Puppy love – Feelings of romantic love felt by young people
- Reward theory of attraction – Mechanics of liking and romantic love
- Romance – Love focused on feelings
- Transference – Phenomenon within psychotherapy
