= Reciprocal liking =

Feeling attraction based on the other's affection

Reciprocal liking, also known as reciprocity of attraction, is the act of a person feeling an attraction to someone only upon learning or becoming aware of that person's attraction to themselves. Reciprocal liking has a significant impact on human attraction and the formation of relationships. People that reciprocally have a liking for each other typically initiate or develop a friendship or romantic relationship. Feelings of admiration, affection, love, and respect are characteristics for reciprocal liking between the two individuals. When there is reciprocal liking there is strong mutual attraction or strong mutual liking, but with others there is not. The feelings of warmth and intimacy also play a role. The consideration and desire to spend time with one another is another strong indicator for reciprocal liking.

Factors influencing interpersonal attraction

== Early studies ==
Studies in psychology show that people tend to like the people that like them. For example, in an early psychological study the participants subtly found out that a stranger liked them. Elliot Aronson and Phillip Worchel conducted the study, which required pairs of participants to have a simple conversation with one another. After the conversation, they privately rated how much they liked their partners. However, one of the individuals in each of the pairs was not actually part of the experiment, but instead was someone working with the researchers, acting as if they were a participant. Each conversation in the study occurred between a real participant and a trained actor. After their conversation, the participants were asked to write a brief statement about what they thought of their partner. After they had written these statements, the experimenters allowed them to read what their respective partners had written. Once the participants had read that their partners liked them, they then reported liking their partners more than when they had read that their partners did not like them.

== Attraction and relationships ==
Attraction is a process in which two people interact, one person transmits verbal, visual, or other stimuli, and on the other hand, the other person responds more or less positively to the stimuli. Reciprocal liking can affect our choice of whom we have relationships with, including romantic, sexual, and platonic. According to the reciprocity principle, people tend to favor the potential partners who return the interest. Experts have claimed that when people select potential mates, they look for someone whose status, physical attractiveness, and personal qualities are about the same as their own. According to a theory, a person will select a potential partner who will better his or her self-image or persona. Researchers acknowledge a set of flirting behaviors, that have been employed by both sexes to attract each other. Conversations that are started by romantic attraction are typically light and include laughter. There have been years of research that have established many principles of attraction, one being an experiment by Aron and his colleagues, conducted in 1989, that found that most people repeatedly mentioned reciprocal liking, personality, and appearance as factors that influenced them to fall in love. People are naturally more attracted to those who express positive emotions towards them and simply knowing that someone is attracted to them can induce this reciprocal interest.

Reciprocal liking can be indicated non-verbally, such as through body languages (for example maintaining eye contact or leaning forward). Reciprocal liking and desirability of a person appear to be the most influential when falling in love. Aron et Al (1989) reported that in their sample of Canadian college students who recently fell in love, approximately 90% of them mentioned some indicator of thinking that the other person was attracted to them and the study also showed that maintaining eye contact was the most common clue. It has also been shown that people often flatter and praise people whose favour they are trying to win, and people said that they even modify their self-presentation to better fit the expectations or preferences of the person to whom they are attracted, or from whom they are seeking attention or affection.

Reciprocal liking has been observed in schools, and amongst the younger generation in general. For example, children evaluate their peers' behaviours, relationships, and interactions and then construct their own interpretations. Students tend to choose friends that are similar to themselves, meaning those who share the same likes and interests. There are two psychological reasons as to why this seems to happen, the first being social pressure and the other being the set of assumptions people tend to make about those who are similar to themselves. Students are often socially pressured to form friendships depending on the person's age, gender, social class, or racial-ethnic background. Parents and other adults involved in a child's life can also have a large influence on the friendships that children choose to have, this being because they teach children to select "appropriate" friends who will not pass on bad morals or inappropriate traits.

== Self-esteem ==
A person's self-esteem also has a significant impact on the frequency and mannerisms of reciprocal liking. While those with positive self-esteem respond to reciprocal liking, those with negative self-esteem seem to prefer working with people who are critical of them. Nathaniel Branden stated that "self-esteem creates a set of implicit expectations about what is possible and appropriate to us", and further said that "one's reality confirms and strengthens one's original belief". This explains why self-esteem plays a role in reciprocal liking.

== Cultural influences ==
People from different cultures can experience and understand different effects of reciprocal liking since some people take in verbal or non-verbal communication differently due to their cultural backgrounds. In high-context cultures (HCC) and low-context cultures (LCC), this can have an impact on how people perceive others depending on a number of factors to do with how they grew up. In HCCs, such as China and Korea, people tend to use vague and ambiguous language, while in LCCs people will be clear and direct in their communication. These two types of cultures can have an effect on reciprocal liking because if one person from each of these two cultures were to be conversing, the person from an LCC might believe that the person from an HCC does not like them due to the fact that they are using ambiguous language while speaking. As a result, the person from a low-context culture may conclude that their high-context culture conversation partner dislikes them, and following the rules of reciprocal liking, they will return this dislike or disinterest.

Culture plays a particular role in reciprocal liking, and cultures that operate independently from other cultures is also an important factor for individuals reciprocally liking each other. Goals of personal fulfillment and emotional intimacy in relationships are often a principal in independent cultures. An example of this may be that love should be the primary basis for two people to get married. The ethic of reciprocal liking is adopted by nearly every major religion, and if this were to stop human culture would not be able to prosper because people routinely exchange goods, services, and other things with one another. On the other hand, it has been proven that there seems to be no signs of romantic love in some cultures such as some non-western countries based on anthropologists and historians.

== Social media ==
Reciprocal liking can also refer to the act of a user liking a social media post, image or article from a different user who initially liked the first user's content. This is often to return the act of kindness.

== See also ==
- Unrequited love – Love that is not reciprocated
