= Self-expansion model =

Psychological theory by Arthur & Elaine Aron

The self-expansion model of interpersonal relationships proposes that people have a basic motivation to expand their physical influence, cognitive complexity, social or bodily identity, and self-awareness, and the psychological reward from falling in love or an intimate relationship is whatever creates this "expansion of the self".

Relationships are an important area for self-expansion, via a process called inclusion of the other in the self (abbreviated IOS), where aspects of a partner (e.g. traits, skills, attitudes, resources, abilities, and worldviews) are incorporated into one's own self concept. Self-expansion can also take the form of having new and exciting experiences with a partner.

Besides romantic love, opportunities for self-expansion include learning, career, family, friendship, athletics, travel, artistic expression, politics, gossip, religion, and the experience of nature.

The model was developed in the 1980s by the psychologists Arthur Aron and Elaine Aron, as a variant of the reward theory of attraction developed by interpersonal attraction researchers of the 1960s and 1970s. A robust research literature on self-expansion has grown, supporting the idea that people do in fact self-expand by absorbing others into their self-concepts, and that self-expansion contributes to relationship well-being. However, some other features of the Arons' original theory remain untested.

== Principles ==
The self-expansion model summarized

The core of the self-expansion model as we have applied it to love can be oversimplified as the following three principles:

1. People seek to expand the self.
2. One way they seek to do so is by attempting to include others in the self through close relationships.
3. People seek situations and experiences that have become associated with experiences of expansion of the self.

— Elaine Aron & Arthur Aron (1996)

=== Motivation ===
One of the underlying themes of self-expansion is that individuals have a very basic motive to self-expand. Self-expansion is the desire to enhance an individual's potential efficacy. Motivational models often refer to self-efficacy as one's belief that they are competent and can achieve specific goals. Within the self-expansion model, potential efficacy is used instead, as it only refers to obtaining resources that will make goal attainment possible. Achievement of this goal is a secondary concern. Some researchers also believe that the motivation for self-expansion is partly rooted in social approval and acceptance.

However, the motivation to self-expand still does influence attraction to others for a potential close relationship. Aron and Aron suggest that our attraction is broken down into two components based on a value-expectancy approach.

- Desirability is the perceived total amount of self-expansion possible from a potential close relationship.
- The second factor, probability, refers to the likelihood that the close relationship with the individual can actually be formed. It can also be conceptualized as the likelihood that self-expansion will occur. Consequently, individuals will seek a partner that has high social status and a greater number of resources. However, to maximize self-expansion, consideration is also given to how likely this person will be loyal and desires to be in the close relationship.

=== Inclusion of the other in the self ===
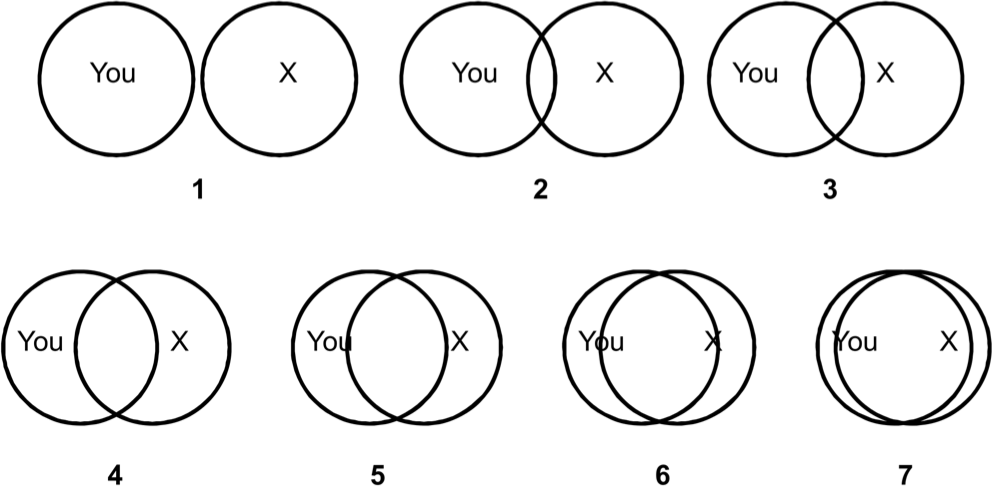
IOS is commonly measured with the IOS Scale, which asks respondents to select which pair of overlapping circles (like a Venn diagram) best represents their current relationship. The scale has also been adapted to measure connection with family & friends, connection with a sports team & game, and connection with a community.

A key principle of the model is that people use close relationships to self-expand by "including the other in the self" (abbreviated IOS). The "self" is often described as the content or the knowledge of who we are. "Others" could be interpreted as individuals. Some studies have found that individuals also include groups or communities.

According to Aron and Aron, when entering a close relationship a person should perceive that the self and other should begin to overlap by including aspects of the other in the self. More specifically, after people include others into themselves, they feel that they have the same resources, ideas, and identity as others, and they will think that the resources, ideas, and identity that others have gained or lost are also what they have gained or lost. These new resources lead to greater inclusion of the other in the self by also incorporating the other's perspectives and identities in the self.

Aron, Aron, Tudor and Nelson conducted several classic studies that scientifically demonstrated that we include the other in the self.

- In one experiment, participants were more likely to distribute money equally between the self and the close other in comparison to distributing the money between oneself and a stranger. The sharing of resources was suggestive of including the self in the other.
- In a second experiment, participants were more likely to remember more nouns for a stranger than a close other (one's mother). This supported the IOS phenomenon, as participants were more likely to take the perspective of the close other thus not being able to remember descriptive nouns of that person.
- In a final experiment participants were required to make yes/no decisions on whether certain traits belonged to themselves. Decisions on traits that were different between a participant and a close other had longer reaction times than decisions on traits that were different between a participant and a stranger.

It was suggested that the increased confusion between the self and the close other was directly related to integrating the other in the self. The degree of closeness in the relationship affects the self and other reaction studies. As two individuals become closer, there is greater confusion and therefore a longer reaction time. As a result, as closeness of a relationship increases, there will be a greater inclusion of the other in the self. Research further shows that such closeness increases overlap between mental representations of self and other, making it harder to differentiate between self‐ and other‐related information, which can impair decision‐making performance and increase cognitive costs in problem‐solving tasks. Such self–other confusion also impairs memory in cooperative decisions: participants made more recall errors when playing trust games with a close partner than with a distant one, especially when they had greater self–other overlap.

=== Two-dimensional model ===
A further theory describes relationships changing across two dimensions:

- direction (whether change is an increase or decrease)
- valence (whether qualities are considered positive or negative)

These two dimensions combine to make four possible categories, where self-expansion is defined as an increase in positive qualities.

Two-dimensional model of relationship self-change
Name	Direction	Valence	Example
Self-expansion	Increase	Positive	Individual acquires an appreciation for ballet, or becomes a better painter
Self-contraction	Decrease	Positive	Individual neglects friendships which a partner disapproves of
Self-adulteration	Increase	Negative	Individual is influenced by a partner to eat junk food
Self-pruning	Decrease	Negative	Individual quits smoking at the behest of a partner

Both self-expansion and self-pruning (where the self improves) are promoted by the Michelangelo phenomenon.

== Interpersonal relationships ==
=== Initial attraction and relationship maintenance ===

Self-expansion usually begins with attraction toward another. Falling in love provides an opportunity for rapid self-expansion as there is a desire to unite with the person you love. Studies have shown that perceived similarity and likeness can promote interpersonal attraction. People tend to prefer others that are similar to them, which goes against the motivation to increase expansion opportunities. While the perceived similarity in interests, background, and values is found to be an important factor affecting attraction, dissimilarity in partners is an avenue for expansion due to the provision of novel resources, opinions, and identification.

A study found that providing information about a high likelihood of developing a relationship with the target person diminished and somewhat reversed the similarity-attraction effect for men in particular. In this case, men were more likely to select dissimilar partners as they provide more opportunity for expansion of the self. People may generally be reluctant to pursue dissimilar others despite the opportunity for self-expansion. They are likely to assume that the dissimilar other would not reciprocate their feelings and would expect no expansion to occur.

For established couples, research shows they can experience different levels of motivation for self-expansion throughout their relationship. As relationships continue to change and evolve, the degree to which they foster expansion and growth may vary in the future. A type of confirmation bias emerges such that those who expect future self-expansion through their relationships are more likely to engage in self-expanding activities. Potential for future expansion is a strong predictor of relationship satisfaction and commitment.

=== Reducing boredom and increasing sexual desire ===
Research shows that when couples participate in some self-expansion activities, these activities can increase relationship satisfaction and improve relationship quality. Moreover, expansion can also reduce negative outcomes such as relationship boredom. In one study, dating college students and married couples attributed boredom in their relationships to low novelty and stimulation. This was also associated with low pleasure and arousal in the relationship. When participants were primed with boredom in another study, they were more inclined to seek out new activities. This follows the principle of the model which posits that individuals possess an inherent motivation to expand themselves. Sexual desire can be affected by relationship boredom. Those that report high sexual desire for their partners are more likely to have sexual and overall satisfaction in their relationships.

Consensually non-monogamous individuals that have more than one sexual or romantic partner at the same time have more opportunities for self-expansion, suggesting positive implications for this relationship arrangement. Transitioning to an open relationship can be a novel and exciting experience for a couple that can increase levels of passion as posited by the research. There are several non-sexual opportunities as well when multiple partners are involved, such as exploring different interests and learning new perspectives.

=== Infidelity and attention to alternatives ===
Infidelity is a severe relational transgression that could lead to the dissolution of the relationship. Ending a relationship is dependent on many key factors such as "improvement of the self" and "hindering self-improvement". Romantic relationships that do not provide sufficient opportunity for individual self-expansion may increase the inclination to perceive and focus on alternative partners. If this occurs to a great extent, it could lead to negative relational outcomes for an exclusive, monogamous relationship such as low relationship satisfaction/stability and a higher susceptibility to infidelity.

In one study, participants that reported lower self-expansion in their relationships were more likely to enjoy interacting with a computer program simulation that was shown to be more self-expanding. In such circumstances, individuals are less likely to employ motivational and perceptual biases that protect against the influence of attractive alternatives. A mediational analysis demonstrated that attention to alternatives explains the observed relationship between self-expansion and infidelity. In another study, fMRI data revealed less brain activation in response to a series of attractive faces when participants were primed to remember moments of self-expansion in their current relationships, suggesting that self-expansion can discourage them from attending to attractive alternatives.

The self-expansion opportunities provided in a relationship can also affect the individual after breaking up. Loss of a relationship that does not promote expansion is found to have positive effects on the individual as it could provide new, previously restricted opportunities for growth. However, the individual may experience "self-contraction" (loss of self) if the relationship did provide sufficient expansion.

=== Non-relational self-expansion in relationships ===
Relationships serve as the primary means of self-expansion. However, personal or non-relational self-expansion can still occur through novel and challenging individual experiences (e.g. learning a new language) resulting in several intrapersonal benefits. Notable behavioral changes caused by individual self-expansion include smoking cessation, weight loss, and better physical health.

Research has shown that increases in personal self-expansion in the same individual were correlated with higher passion in the relationship, while low levels of passion were observed for high levels of self-expansion across participants. This suggests that growth experienced through non-shared activities can fulfill individual needs but could reduce passion for one's partner. Another contributing factor is the level of support received by the partner. A study of retired married couples showed that prior support from partners for individual growth predicted happiness and satisfaction during retirement years. Relationship satisfaction for ongoing couples is increased when partners are encouraging non-relational self-expanding activities. This occurs as individuals believe their partners are facilitating their expansion and associate them with that expansion.

== Inclusion of the ingroup in the self ==
The idea of including the other in the self has been extended to include an entire ingroup in the self. An ingroup is an interdependent set of individuals with which a person identifies. The individual believes he or she is a member of this group. In fact, several academic groups have found similar findings in the me/not me reaction time paradigm at a group level. Participants showed a slower reaction time for traits that were incongruent between the self and ingroup. This was in comparison to quicker reaction times for traits that were congruent between the self and ingroup. The slow reaction times were consistent with the inclusion of the ingroup in the self claim as it suggested that the individual had included group characteristics in the self. As a result, there was difficulty recalling if a trait belong to the self or ingroup.

Several researchers have examined the role of ingroup identification (i.e. a person's prolonged psychological connection to an ingroup) and self-expansion. In fact, Trop and Wright refined the meaning of ingroup identification and believed it was analogous to the inclusion of the ingroup in the self. The authors found that the degree of connectedness to the ingroup will affect confusion of self-descriptors. People who highly identified with an ingroup showed slower reaction times for self-descriptors that did not relate to the ingroup (this is consistent with previous findings). However, low ingroup identification lead to no differences in reaction times between whether or not the self-descriptors were also descriptive of the ingroup. This demonstrated that the level of identification with an ingroup can be conceptualized as the degree to which we will include the ingroup in the self.

The central motivation for including the ingroup in the self parallels the self-expansion model at the interpersonal level. The self-expansion model suggests that we are strongly motivated to expand ourselves by including the other in the self. This occurs when an individual incorporates the other's perspectives, identities and resources. Likewise, it has been proposed that including an ingroup in the self, or ingroup identification, is partly influenced by the self-expansion motive. Inclusion of the ingroup's perspectives and resources can increase one's confidence in completing a variety of goals. Thus, a group's attractiveness is often based on the potential for self-expansion. A group with higher social status and a greater amount of potential resources is more likely to be included in the self.

== Intergroup relations ==
The contact hypothesis by Gordon Allport is an area of psychology that focuses on positive aspects of intergroup relations. The hypothesis suggests that when there is cooperation, equal status, common goals and authority support then contact between members of different groups can result in reduced negative attitudes. In addition, positive emotions between intergroup members was said to be of utmost importance as it would lead to positive attitudes which, in turn, would generalize to the entire out group. An out group is a set of individuals with which the individual does not identify. It was unclear how this attitude generalization actually happened. Recently, the process of including the out group in the self was used as an explanatory mechanism for this generalization.

Including the out group in the self is based on the similar self-expansion notion of including the other or ingroup in the self. As a person becomes a friend with an out group member, the aspects of the out group is included in the self when that group is made salient. Essentially, representation of the out group and its identity is shared with our representation of the self. Including the out group in the self can vary; a person may actually become a member of an out group.

Empirical evidence seems to support the inclusion of the out group in the self hypothesis. In one study white women were paired off with either another white woman (ingroup member) or a Latina woman (out group member). The pairs of women met over an extended period of time completing different activities together, which led to a measurable close friendship. Women with an intergroup friendship were more likely to have positive intergroup attitudes, less likely to endorse anti-minority policies and less likely to demonstrate intergroup anxiety. The study suggests that the intergroup close relationship led to improved attitudes towards the entire out group as suggested by the inclusion of the out group in the self mechanism. Another study also found that the level of inclusion of the out group in the self would affect the amount of decreased prejudicial attitudes.

=== Self-expansion motive ===
It may be the case that individuals want to make friends with out group members (instead of oppress and mistreat the out group) because of the self-expansion motive. Based on Aron and Aron's original work, people want to expand the self and an optimal way of doing so is to make close friendships that give the opportunity for increased perspectives, identities and resources. People who are most similar to ourselves provide a diminished capacity for self-expansion. As a result, an individual may turn to out group members for friendship because they are different from one's self-concept. These differences allow for a greater likelihood to increase resources, identities and perspectives, which is consistent with the self-expansion motive. A recent study has shown that, consistent with this idea, priming high self-expansion motivation enhances out group self-expansion and the quality and outcomes of out group interactions (e.g. greater self-efficacy, reported closeness, and self-growth).

=== Barriers to self-expansion at the intergroup level ===
Self-expansion motives can explain why people may appreciate intergroup contact, however, it can also provide explanations for why we avoid this intergroup contact. People may be cautious of self-expansion due to a sense of self-loss. As we self-expand in one area we may put ourselves at risk of losing aspects of the self in another area. Consequently, people may be fearful of creating a close relationship with an out group member as this may trigger animosity from original ingroup members. Often individuals must attempt to balance the potential benefits of including the out group in the self with the potential loss of ingroup friends and the associated resources. If the self-loss outweighs the self-expansion, it is possible for a decrease in perceived self-efficacy.

The second barrier to self-expansion is the risk that an overabundance of self-expansion might occur in too short a period. The accumulation of new resources and perspectives in our self-concept leads to a need for self-integration (i.e. combining different resources, identities and perspectives into single overarching self-concept). An excessive amount of self-expansion without proper self-integration can be quite stressful (e.g. moving to a new city, or starting a new job). It has been suggested that when a person is socially stable, self-expansion via an out group member is most likely to be successful. Consequently, the likelihood for cross-group contact and the inclusion of the out group in the self is dependent on the degree of self-expansion in other domains.
