= Arthur Aron =

American psychologist (born 1945)

- Born: July 2, 1945 (age 81)
- Education: University of California at Berkeley; University of Toronto
- Known for: Self-expansion model of motivation in interpersonal relationships
- Spouse: Elaine Aron
- Scientific career
- Fields: Psychology of interpersonal relationships social psychology
- Workplaces: State University of New York at Stony Brook
- Doctoral advisor: A. J. Arrowood
- Website: www.psychology.stonybrook.edu/aronlab-/

Arthur Aron (born July 2, 1945) is a professor of psychology at the State University of New York at Stony Brook. He is best known for his work on intimacy in interpersonal relationships, and development of the self-expansion model of motivation in close relationships.

In 2018, Aron featured in the Australian narrative film 36 Questions.

== Early life and education ==
Arthur Aron received a bachelor's degree in psychology and philosophy in 1967 and a master's degree in social psychology in 1968, both from the University of California, Berkeley. He earned a PhD in social psychology from the University of Toronto in 1970.

== Career ==
Aron's work focuses on the role, creation, and maintenance of friendship and intimacy in interpersonal relationships. He developed the self-expansion model of close relationships; it posits that one of the motivations humans have for forming close relationships is self-expansion, i.e., "expansion of the self", or personal growth and development.

=== 36 questions ===
In 1997, Aron and his wife published an academic paper called The Experimental Generation of Interpersonal Closeness: A Procedure and Some Preliminary Findings, in which the appendix featured a set of 36 questions of increasing intimacy. Participants who were strangers to each other were grouped in pairs to ask each other the questions, and found afterwards to develop a stronger friendship and in some cases even a relationship. In January 2015, New York Times columnist Mandy Len Catron posted the article "To Fall In Love With Anyone, Do This", which listed them as the "36 questions that lead to love". The list has been used in hundreds of studies, to create closeness in a lab setting, to break down barriers between strangers, and improve understanding between police officers and community members.

== Personal life ==
Aron married Elaine Aron on February 13, 1975.

His son is Elijah Aron, a television writer known for his work on BoJack Horseman.. He has two grandsons.

== Publications ==
- Aron, A.; Melinat, E.; Aron, E. N.; Vallone, R. D.; Bator, R. J. (April 1997). "The Experimental Generation of Interpersonal Closeness: A Procedure and Some Preliminary Findings". Personality and Social Psychology Bulletin. 23 (4): 363–377. doi:10.1177/0146167297234003. Archived from the original on 17 May 2024.
