= Elijah Aron =

American television writer and producer

- Education: Harvard University
- Occupations: Television writer, producer
- Years active: 2001–present
- Known for: BoJack Horseman, Undone

Elijah Aron is an American television writer and producer. He spent five years as a writer and co-executive producer on the Netflix series BoJack Horseman (2015–2019) and was co-executive producer on Undone (2019–2022) for Amazon Prime Video. He co-wrote the BoJack Horseman episode "Fish Out of Water," which contains almost no dialogue and was nominated for the Writers Guild of America Award for Television: Animation in 2017. In 2019 he received a Primetime Emmy Award nomination for Outstanding Animated Program on BoJack Horseman episode "Free Churro." He won the WGA Award in 2023 for "Rectify," an episode of Undone co-written with Patrick Metcalf.

== Early life and education ==
Aron attended Harvard University and graduated with the Class of 1992. By his own account, he found he could not compete academically and threw himself into extracurriculars instead; he wrote plays and musicals, made short films with classmates, and took animation classes with Derek Lamb and Janet Perlman. After college he moved to San Francisco, where he and several friends from Harvard converted an old shoe store into a theater. The company staged surrealist and experimental shows, but Aron struggled financially and worked as a temp and in a bookstore to support himself.

== Career ==
Aron's first television work was writing scripts for the Sci Fi Channel series Black Scorpion. He moved to Los Angeles in 2000 and took a job as a development executive at Disney Television Animation, reading scripts, reviewing storyboards, and evaluating pitches. He transitioned to writing when he joined the staff of Drawn Together (2004–2007), an animated parody of reality television on Comedy Central. Over the next decade he wrote for several network comedies; his credits from this period include It's Always Sunny in Philadelphia, Better Off Ted, and all four seasons of Raising Hope (2010–2014).

In 2015 Aron joined BoJack Horseman, created by Raphael Bob-Waksberg. He started as a consulting producer and later became co-executive producer, working on 56 episodes over five years. He and Jordan Young wrote the season-three episode "Fish Out of Water" (2016), in which BoJack attends a film festival underwater and cannot speak to anyone around him. The episode has fewer than three minutes of audible dialogue; Aron and Young built the script out of scene description rather than spoken lines. The Ringer noted that Aron and Young managed to fold a one-off adventure into the recurring concerns of the series as a whole. "Fish Out of Water" was nominated for the WGA Award for Television: Animation and for Best Animated Television Production at the 44th Annie Awards.

Aron wrote the season-six premiere, "A Horse Walks into a Rehab" (2019), and received another WGA nomination for it. He was also among the credited producers when "Free Churro" was nominated for the Primetime Emmy Award for Outstanding Animated Program at the 71st Creative Arts Emmys in 2019; it was the first time the series had been recognized in that category.

After BoJack Horseman, Aron moved to Undone (2019–2022), a rotoscoped animated series created by Kate Purdy and Bob-Waksberg for Amazon. He served as co-executive producer and wrote for both seasons. His episode "Rectify," co-written with Patrick Metcalf, won the WGA Award for Television: Animation at the 75th ceremony in March 2023. He has since worked on the HBO Max animated series Velma and on Long Story Short (2025).

== Awards and nominations ==
Year	Award	Category	Work	Result
2017	WGA Award	Television: Animation	"Fish Out of Water" (BoJack Horseman) (with Jordan Young)	Nominated
2019	Primetime Emmy Award	Outstanding Animated Program	"Free Churro" (BoJack Horseman) (shared)	Nominated
2020	WGA Award	Television: Animation	"A Horse Walks into a Rehab" (BoJack Horseman)	Nominated
2023	WGA Award	Television: Animation	"Rectify" (Undone) (with Patrick Metcalf)	Won
