= Drive reduction theory (learning theory) =

Psychological theory of motivation

Drive reduction theory, developed by Clark Hull in 1943, is a major theory of motivation in the behaviorist learning theory tradition. "Drive" is defined as motivation that arises due to a psychological or physiological need. It works as an internal stimulus that motivates an individual to sate the drive. It has also been described as an internal and instinctual process that moves individuals to take actions that would allow them to attain their desired goal or end-state. Simply put, drive reduction theory suggests that when humans experience a physiological or psychological need, such as reducing hunger or boredom, they feel a drive to satisfy that need.

== Details ==
According to such theorists as Clark Hull and Kenneth Spence, drive reduction is a major force behind learning and behavior. Primary drives are innate drives (e.g., thirst, hunger, and sex), whereas secondary drives are learned by conditioning (e.g., money). Doris Kraeling and Byron Campbell conducted experiments to determine if “reduction would be more effective as a reinforcer if the initial drive were low than if the initial drive were high.” Their findings were that “changes in stimuli are more discriminable at low levels of stimulus intensity than at higher levels of stimulus intensity.” Multiple drives result when an organism is faced with more than one need simultaneously. Research has shown that this condition affects learning.

There are also the complications to drive reduction theory caused by so-called "pleasure-seeking" behaviors, which seem to be contradictory to the theory's precepts. Why would an individual actively seek out more stimulation if it is already in a state of relaxation and fulfillment? A good example is when an individual leaves home to go to a potentially dangerous carnival. There is no base physiological drive to go to the carnival, but the individual exhausts resources to go there. Judson Brown attempts to explain this phenomenon, saying, "the sensory consequences of most responses are practically never intense enough to provide increments to the drive level."

== Motivational readiness ==
An expansion on the drive-incentive link, developed by Warden, states that an individual's physiological needs will be coupled with a proportionate drive. Affordances are the available resources present in an individual's environment; these would be at their disposal to use to obtain their desired end-state. The individual's environment, in which the affordances are located, is similar to Lewin's living space. The level of effectiveness and affordance depends on what the want is. The affordance properties need to be able to suit the characteristics needed for the want to be fulfilled. For example, an individual whose want is shelter from a hail storm would not be satisfied if the affordance given was a miniature sized bag of gummy worms. Additionally, based on Warden's drive-incentive link, as either the drive or incentive increases, the behavior also increases. According to Hull, due to the interconnected properties of drive and motivation, in the presence of a drive, the discomfort of the individual increases; this discomfort gives them the motivation to dispel the need at the core of the drive.

The emergence of the theory of motivational readiness comes from previous attempts to explain how internal and external sources interact to influence motivation and behavior. This theory is dependent on the notion that individuals will have a want and that they will take actions to obtain the want (assuming that is actually obtainable). Wants can be any physiological or psychological need, such as the need for food; as an example, an individual can drive to a diner with the expectation that their hunger will be satiated by the food there.

Motivational readiness has been prominent in studies involving exercise, weight control, diet, and smoking.

== See also ==
- Yerkes–Dodson law of performance and arousal
- Incentive theory of motivation
