= Cindy Hazan =

American attachment theorist

- Education: University of Denver (BA, 1982); University of Denver (MA, 1986); University of Denver (PhD, 1988)
- Known for: Attachment in adults
- Scientific career
- Fields: Psychology; Attachment theory
- Workplaces: Cornell University

Cynthia Hazan is an American psychologist whose interest is human mating and pair bonding, known for her influential research on attachment in adults. Hazan is credited (along with Phillip Shaver) as discovering that adult relationships share similarity with a child's attachment to a parent. She currently teaches at Cornell University, where she was awarded the Andrew H. & James S. Tisch Distinguished University Professorship for excellent undergraduate education.

Hazan holds a BA in psychology, and an MA and PhD in social and personality psychology, all from the University of Denver.

== Career ==
Most of Hazan's research has used the framework of ethological attachment theory. This theory was initially developed by John Bowlby, and then Mary Ainsworth, focusing on how infants behave with their caregivers.

Hazan's research on the subject of adult attachment began in 1987, with the journal article "Romantic Love Conceptualized as an Attachment Process" which expanded the concept of "attachment" to adult relationships. The article (coauthored with Phillip Shaver) was so influential that it became one of the top ten most-cited articles in the Journal of Personality and Social Psychology. In 2012, Hazan & Shaver were awarded the Scientific Impact Award by the Society of Experimental Social Psychology for their work on this.

She developed the course "Human Bonding" at Cornell University, which she has taught for over 25 years. The psychologist Lisa Diamond has commented on Hazan's influence over her own career (having taken the course), saying "By the end of the course, I was completely besotted with the science of intimate relationships".
