= Marian Bakermans-Kranenburg =

Dutch scientist

Marian Bakermans-Kranenburg (born 19 June 1965) is a Dutch developmental psychologist known for her research on attachment theory, parenting, child development, differential susceptibility, and the neurobiological foundations of caregiving. Her work has examined how genetic, hormonal, and environmental factors interact to shape child development and parent–child relationships. She is particularly known for her contributions to attachment research, studies of oxytocin and parenting, the development and evaluation of parenting interventions, and research on fathers' caregiving behavior.

Bakermans-Kranenburg is Professor at the William James Center for Research at ISPA – Instituto Universitário in Lisbon, Portugal. She has also served as Senior Research Fellow at The New School for Social Research in New York, Visiting Consultant at the National Institute of Education of Nanyang Technological University in Singapore, Visiting Senior Research Fellow at Stockholm University, and Honorary Senior Visiting Fellow at the University of Cambridge.

Throughout her career, Bakermans-Kranenburg has been among the most highly cited researchers in developmental psychology. Her publications have received more than 43,000 citations according to the Web of Science, and she has repeatedly been recognized as a Clarivate Highly Cited Researcher in Psychology and Psychiatry. Her research has influenced scientific understanding of attachment relationships, child maltreatment, adoption, foster care, and family-based interventions.

== Early life and education ==
Bakermans-Kranenburg was born in Alphen aan den Rijn, South Holland, the Netherlands. She studied educational sciences at Leiden University and received her master's degree in 1989. In 1993 she completed a PhD at Leiden University under the supervision of developmental psychologist Marinus H. van IJzendoorn. Her doctoral dissertation, Het gehechtheidsbiografisch interview. Betrouwbaarheid en discriminante validiteit ("The Adult Attachment Interview: Reliability and Discriminant Validity"), examined the psychometric properties of the Adult Attachment Interview, a widely used measure in attachment research.

== Academic career ==
Following completion of her doctorate, Bakermans-Kranenburg joined the Centre for Child and Family Studies at Leiden University as an assistant professor in 1993. She was promoted to associate professor in 2004 and became full professor of Education and Child Studies in 2007. During her tenure at Leiden University she helped establish one of Europe's leading research programs on attachment, parenting, and child development.

In 2018 she joined the Clinical Child and Family Studies at Vrije Universiteit Amsterdam. In 2022 she was appointed Full Professor at the William James Center for Research at ISPA – Instituto Universitário in Lisbon. In 2024 she was additionally appointed Full Professor at San Sebastián University in Chile.

Bakermans-Kranenburg has held numerous international visiting appointments, including Honorary Senior Visiting Fellow at the University of Cambridge (2017–2018), Senior Research Fellow at The New School for Social Research in New York (from 2022), Visiting Consultant at the National Institute of Education of Nanyang Technological University in Singapore (2022–2023), and Visiting Senior Research Fellow at Stockholm University (2023).

== Research ==
=== Attachment theory and parenting ===
Much of Bakermans-Kranenburg's research has focused on attachment theory and the role of sensitive caregiving in children's socioemotional development. She has conducted influential studies examining the intergenerational transmission of attachment, parental sensitivity, attachment disorganization, and the developmental consequences of early adversity. Her work has contributed to several large-scale international collaborations and meta-analyses synthesizing findings from thousands of attachment assessments worldwide.

Together with colleagues including Marinus van IJzendoorn, she contributed to meta-analytic studies on child attachment, parental sensitivity, and the Adult Attachment Interview. These projects have helped establish empirical estimates of attachment distributions across cultures and clarified the mechanisms through which attachment relationships influence later development.

=== Differential susceptibility ===
Bakermans-Kranenburg is one of the leading researchers associated with differential susceptibility theory, which proposes that some individuals are more responsive than others to environmental influences, both positive and negative. Her studies have explored how genetic polymorphisms, temperament, and biological characteristics moderate children's responses to parenting and intervention programs.

Her research provided evidence that the same biological factors associated with increased vulnerability under adverse conditions may also be associated with greater benefits from supportive environments. This work contributed to a shift from deficit-oriented models toward frameworks emphasizing developmental plasticity.

=== Neurobiology of parenting ===
A major focus of Bakermans-Kranenburg's research has been the biological basis of caregiving. She has investigated hormonal, genetic, epigenetic, and neural mechanisms involved in parenting, with particular emphasis on oxytocin, vasopressin, cortisol, testosterone, and related neuroendocrine systems.

Using neuroimaging, hormonal assays, and experimental paradigms involving infant crying and infant laughter, she examined how adults respond to infant signals and how biological processes influence caregiving behavior. Her studies were among the first to investigate the neural and hormonal correlates of fatherhood and paternal caregiving.

=== Research on fathers ===
Bakermans-Kranenburg's ERC-funded research program examined the transition to fatherhood and the neurobiological factors involved in paternal caregiving. Through a series of randomized controlled trials, her research team tested the effects of pharmacological interventions involving oxytocin and vasopressin, as well as behavioral interventions including prenatal video-feedback and infant-carrying programs.

These studies investigated how hormonal changes, brain activity, and caregiving behavior are affected by early parenting experiences and intervention programs. The project contributed significantly to the growing literature on fathers' involvement in child development and challenged assumptions that parenting research should focus primarily on mothers.

=== Child maltreatment, foster care, and adoption ===
Bakermans-Kranenburg has also conducted extensive research on child maltreatment, institutional care, foster care, and adoption. Her work has documented the developmental effects of abuse, neglect, and institutionalization and evaluated interventions designed to improve outcomes for vulnerable children.

She has published influential meta-analyses on child maltreatment and attachment disorganization and has advocated for family-based alternatives to institutional care. Her research has informed policy discussions regarding child protection, adoption, and foster care systems in Europe and internationally.

=== Video-feedback Intervention to Promote Positive Parenting and Sensitive Discipline ===
Bakermans-Kranenburg is one of the developers of the Video-feedback Intervention to Promote Positive Parenting and Sensitive Discipline (VIPP-SD), an evidence-based parenting intervention developed in collaboration with Femmie Juffer and Marinus van IJzendoorn.

The intervention uses video recordings of parent–child interactions to help caregivers recognize and respond sensitively to children's signals. Originally developed for families with young children, VIPP-SD has subsequently been adapted for adoptive families, foster families, families of children with developmental disabilities, school settings, and online delivery formats.

Randomized controlled trials and meta-analyses have demonstrated positive effects of the intervention on parental sensitivity, child attachment security, and children's behavioral outcomes. VIPP-SD has been implemented in numerous countries and is regarded as one of the most extensively studied attachment-based parenting interventions.

== Editorial activities ==
Bakermans-Kranenburg has served as Associate Editor of Attachment & Human Development and as Consulting Editor of Child Development. She has also served on the editorial boards of journals including Development and Psychopathology, Journal of Family Psychology, Infant Behavior and Development, Social Neuroscience, Parenting: Science and Practice, and Child Development Perspectives.

From 2013 to 2019 she was a member of the Publications Committee of the Society for Research in Child Development.

== Honors and awards ==
- Honorary Doctorate, Lund University (2017)
- European Research Council Advanced Grant (2015)
- Fellow of the Association for Psychological Science (2012)
- Elected Member of the Royal Netherlands Academy of Arts and Sciences (2012)
- NWO Vici Award (2009–2010)
- Bowlby–Ainsworth Award (2005)
- NWO Vidi Award (2004)

Bakermans-Kranenburg was named a Clarivate Highly Cited Researcher in Psychology/Psychiatry/Cross-Field annually starting from 2016, placing her among the most frequently cited researchers in her field worldwide.

== Selected publications ==
- Bakermans-Kranenburg, Marian J; Lotz, Anna; Alyousefi-van Dijk, Kim; van IJzendoorn, Marinus (2019-11-12). "Birth of a Father: Fathering in the First 1,000 Days". Child Development Perspectives. 13 (4): 247–253. doi:10.1111/cdep.12347. ISSN 1750-8592. PMC 6919930. PMID 31894183.
- Madigan, Sheri; Fearon, R. M. Pasco; van IJzendoorn, Marinus H.; Duschinsky, Robbie; Schuengel, Carlo; Bakermans-Kranenburg, Marian J.; Ly, Anh; Cooke, Jessica E.; Deneault, Audrey-Ann; Oosterman, Mirjam; Verhage, Marije L. (2023). "The first 20,000 strange situation procedures: A meta-analytic review". Psychological Bulletin. 149 (1–2): 99–132. doi:10.1037/bul0000388. ISSN 1939-1455.
- van IJzendoorn, Marinus H.; Schuengel, Carlo; Wang, Qiang; Bakermans-Kranenburg, Marian J. (2022). "Improving parenting, child attachment, and externalizing behaviors: Meta-analysis of the first 25 randomized controlled trials on the effects of Video-feedback Intervention to promote Positive Parenting and Sensitive Discipline". Development and Psychopathology. 35 (1): 241–256. doi:10.1017/s0954579421001462. ISSN 0954-5794. PMID 35034668.
- Madigan, Sheri; Deneault, Audrey-Ann; Duschinsky, Robbie; Bakermans-Kranenburg, Marian J.; Schuengel, Carlo; van IJzendoorn, Marinus H.; Ly, Anh; Fearon, R. M. Pasco; Eirich, Rachel; Verhage, Marije L. (2024). "Maternal and paternal sensitivity: Key determinants of child attachment security examined through meta-analysis". Psychological Bulletin. 150 (7): 839–872. doi:10.1037/bul0000433. ISSN 1939-1455. PMID 38709619.
- Bakermans-Kranenburg, Marian J.; van IJzendoorn, Marinus H. (2009). "The first 10,000 Adult Attachment Interviews: distributions of adult attachment representations in clinical and non-clinical groups". Attachment & Human Development. 11 (3): 223–263. doi:10.1080/14616730902814762. ISSN 1461-6734. PMID 19455453.
