= Vantage sensitivity =

Developmental psychology theory

Vantage sensitivity is a psychological concept related to environmental sensitivity, initially developed by Michael Pluess and Jay Belsky. It describes individual differences in response to positive experiences and supportive environmental influences. According to vantage sensitivity, people differ considerably in their sensitivity to positive aspects of the environment, with some people benefitting particularly strongly from positive experiences such as parental care, supportive relationships, and psychological interventions, whereas others tend to respond less or not at all.

== Background ==
Vantage sensitivity (right side of diagram) describes individual differences in response to positive experiences and supportive environmental influences, distinguishing it from the diathesis–stress model. In response to positive exposures, the level of functioning in individuals having vantage sensitivity increases, but remains unchanged in individuals having vantage resistance.

The concept of vantage sensitivity is related to other theories of environmental sensitivity such as differential susceptibility according to which some people are more sensitive than others to both negative and positive experiences. Vantage sensitivity provides a specific theoretical perspective and terminology to describe individual differences in response to exclusively positive experiences.

According to vantage sensitivity theory, people who benefit from positive experiences display vantage sensitivity as a function of vantage sensitivity factors (i.e., genetic, physiological, or psychological traits) whereas those who benefit less show vantage resistance due to the presence of vantage resistance factors (or the absence of vantage sensitivity factors). Differences in vantage sensitivity are considered to reflect neurobiological differences in the central nervous system, which are influenced by genetic as well as environmental factors.

== Evidence ==
A growing number of studies provide empirical evidence for individual differences in vantage sensitivity across a wide range of established sensitivity markers, including genetic, physiological, and psychological ones.

=== Genetic markers ===
Several studies report that differences in response to positive experiences are associated with genetic sensitivity. For example, Keers et al. created a polygenic score for environmental sensitivity based on thousands of gene variants and found that children with higher genetic sensitivity responded more strongly to higher quality of psychological treatment.

=== Physiological markers ===
Studies suggest that a higher physiological reactivity to stress (indicated by cortisol) is associated with a stronger positive response to positive influences. For instance, a study testing the efficacy of exposure-based psychotherapy, a type of psychological treatment that is used with people suffering from panic disorders and agoraphobia, found that people whose cortisol response was higher during exposure were also more likely to recover faster and benefit more from the treatment.

=== Psychological markers ===
A number of studies have shown that children who score high on the Highly Sensitive Child (HSC) scale, a psychometric tool designed to measure sensitivity, respond more positively to psychological interventions. For example, Nocentini et al. conducted a randomised controlled trial to investigate whether sensitivity was associated with greater response to a school-based anti-bullying intervention. Results indicated that sensitive children benefitted significantly more from the positive effects of the intervention. Vantage sensitivity has also been found to influence the socio-emotional well-being of young people in school. The wellbeing of sensitive adolescents increased in response to positive changes in the school environment. In adults, high sensitivity has been found to predict a greater response to positive pictures and increased leader-rated employee task performance.

== Related concepts ==
- Diathesis-stress model
- Differential susceptibility
- Environmental sensitivity
- Gene-environment interaction
- Highly sensitive person
- Sensory processing sensitivity
