= PTT =

PTT may refer to:

== Businesses and organizations ==
- PTT Public Company Limited, a Thai oil and gas company
- Pashtun Tahafuz Tehrik, a human rights movement in Pakistan
- Pennsylvania Tunnel and Terminal Railroad, the New York Penn Station tunnel owner
- Pizza Time Theatre (a former name of Chuck E. Cheese, an American entertainment restaurant chain
- Police Tactical Team, Singapore
- Postal, telegraph and telephone service, a type of government agency
  - Posterijen, Telegrafie en Telefonie (Netherlands)
  - Postes, télégraphes et téléphones (France)
  - PTT (Switzerland)
  - Posta Telgraf Teşkilatı (Turkey)
- Prince's Trust Team, a British charitable youth programme

== Music ==
- "PTT (Paint the Town)", a 2021 single by Loona
- Pull Tiger Tail, a British indie band (2006–2009)

== Science ==
- Partial thromboplastin time, a coagulation measure
- Photothermal Therapy, a treatment
- Photothermal time, in plants
- 2β-propanoyl-3β-(4-tolyl)-tropane, a cocaine analogue
- Polytrimethylene terephthalate, a polyester
- Pulse Transit Time, a blood pressure measure

== Technology ==
- PTT Bulletin Board System, a Taiwanese forum
- Pneumatic tube
- Push to talk (or "Press-to-Transmit"), in telecommunications
- Pass-the-ticket, in hacking

== Other uses ==
- Petronas Twin Towers, Kuala Lumpur, Malaysia
- Port Talbot Town F.C., a Welsh association football club
- Power transition theory, an international relations theory
