= Marinus van IJzendoorn =

Dutch university teacher and psychologist

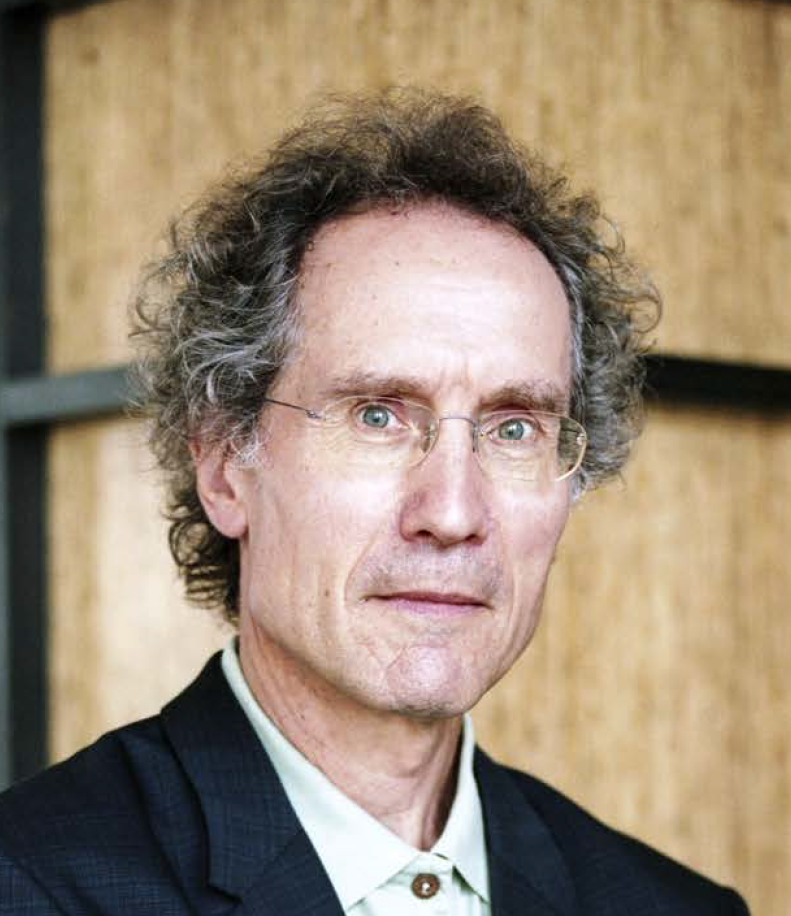
- Born: May 14, 1952 (age 74); Tiel
- Education: University of Amsterdam, Free University of Berlin
- Known for: Contributions to attachment theory
- Scientific career
- Fields: Child and family studies
- Workplaces: Leiden University, Erasmus University
- Thesis: (1978)
- Website: www.marinusvanijzendoorn.nl www.opvoeding-wetenschap.nl

Marinus H. "Rien" van IJzendoorn (May 14, 1952) is professor of human development and one of the co-leaders of Generation R at the Erasmus University Rotterdam. His work has focussed on the social, psychological, and neurobiological determinants of parenting and child development, with special emphasis on attachment, emotion regulation, differential susceptibility hypothesis, and child maltreatment.

== Biography ==
In 1976, van IJzendoorn graduated cum laude at the University of Amsterdam. Two years later he obtained his PhD magna cum laude at the Free University of Berlin/Max Planck Institute for Human Development and Education. After this he continued his work at Leiden University. In 1981, at age 29, he became full professor. Van IJzendoorn worked as a guest researcher at several places in the United States and Israel. He received a Pionier-grant from the Netherlands Organisation for Scientific Research in 1991, which was used for the start of a new research group. In 1998 he became a member of the Royal Netherlands Academy of Arts and Sciences. In 1998 and 1999 he was the dean of the Faculty of Social and Behavioural Sciences. In 2004 Van IJzendoorn received the Spinoza Prize for his work. In 2007 he was awarded for his Distinguished International Contributions to Child Development by the Society for Research in Child Development, and in 2008 he received an honorary doctorate at the University of Haifa. In 2011 he received the Aristotle Prize of the European Federation of Psychologists' Associations, and the Bowlby-Ainsworth Founder Award of the Center for Mental Health Promotion and The New York Attachment Consortium. In 2013 he was awarded the Dr Hendrik Muller Prize from the Royal Netherlands Academy of Arts and Sciences. He has been a fellow of the Association for Psychological Science since 2011. Van IJzendoorn is an ISI Thomson Reuters Highly Cited Researcher 2016 placing him in the top 1% most cited scientists in the psychology/psychiatry world over the years 2004–2014.

Van IJzendoorn was one of the founders of the Lolle Nauta Foundation (now extinct) that aimed to stimulate the study of education, developmental psychology, and child and family studies on the African continent.

Van IJzendoorn still holds an appointment (until 2022) as professor of human development at the Department of Psychology, Education, and Child Studies, Erasmus University Rotterdam, and is a visiting researcher at the University of Cambridge.

== Research ==
=== Attachment ===
Van IJzendoorn's main research topic is attachment across the life-span. Attachment has been briefly defined as children's "strong disposition to seek proximity to and contact with a specific figure and to do so in certain situations, notably when they are frightened, tired or ill". Inspired by Darwinian evolutionary theory and Harlow's experimental work with rhesus monkeys, John Bowlby was the first to propose that human genetic selection had favoured attachment behaviours since they increased infant-parent proximity, which in turn enhanced the chances for infant survival. Attachment is considered to be an inborn capacity of every exemplar of the human species. Individual differences in the quality of attachment emerge in the first years of life, and central to attachment theory is the idea that parenting, more specifically parental sensitive responsiveness to the infant's distress signals, determines whether children develop a secure or an insecure attachment relationship with their primary caregiver. Van IJzendoorn introduced in 1995 the quantitative model of the 'transmission gap' between parents' attachments and their infants' attachment as mediated by parental sensitive responsiveness. This model generated a host of empirical studies trying to bridge the gap (see for a meta-analysis of this work).

=== Video-feedback intervention ===
Together with Femmie Juffer and Marian Bakermans-Kranenburg, Van IJzendoorn developed and tested In the Video Intervention to promote Positive Parenting (VIPP) program Video feedback provides the opportunity to focus on the infant's videotaped signals and expressions, thereby stimulating the parent's observational skills and empathy for his/her child. It also enables positive reinforcement of the parent's moments of sensitive behaviour shown on the videotape. In the Video Intervention to promote Positive Parenting-Sensitive Discipline] (VIPP-SD) thematic discussions about limit setting issues are included, based on Patterson's ideas about coercive cycles (see: Morality throughout the Life Span), in order to support parents of 'terrible two's and three's' to deal with discipline in a consistent and warm manner.

Twenty years of thoroughly testing the VIPP and VIPP-SD programs in randomized trials in various at-risk and clinical groups have demonstrated its efficacy in improving positive parenting skills: The combined effect size on parenting sensitivity is substantial. Separate modules have been developed for use with home-based and centre-based child care (VIPP-CC), Turkish-Dutch families (VIPP-TM), and families with a child with Autism Spectrum Disorder (VIPP-AUTI).

=== Differential susceptibility ===
The differential susceptibility hypothesis proposes that in positive environments vulnerable children may outperform their peers who turn out to be less susceptible not only to bad environments but also to optimal environments. Moreover, the same characteristics that make individuals vulnerable to adversity also make them disproportionately likely to benefit from contextual support. What characteristics render individuals susceptible to environmental influences? Three broad constructs have been proposed and tested as markers of susceptibility: (a) reactive temperament, (b) biological sensitivity to stress, and (c) genetic make-up. The idea of genetic susceptibility was coined by the Leiden team. Importantly, the efficacy of interventions might be underestimated or even go undetected as a main effect when it is hidden in interactions with (genetic, biological or temperamental) characteristics of the recipient of the intervention.

=== Oxytocin ===
In humans, oxytocin has been shown to be associated with delivery, mood regulation, sexual functioning and parenting behaviours. Emerging studies are showing an increasing link between oxytocin levels in humans and parent-child relationships. One idea is that increased oxytocin levels facilitates postnatal parental behaviour and the formation of an emotional bond between parent and infant, in mothers and fathers alike, by acting to reduce anxiety and ameliorate responses to external stresses. Parents who have a less anxious state of mind are able to increase their focus on infant care, improve mood, and facilitate the capacity to read non-verbal infant cues and stimulate the social learning and reward system in response to infant cues. Although there are strong animal models for the role of oxytocin in parental behaviour, one of the key questions in the development of a psychobiology of human care-giving and attachment is the degree to which the considerable variation in parenting can be accounted for through similar biological mechanisms such as the moderating role of the oxytocin receptor gene (OXTR) polymorphisms and experimentally induced oxytocin levels. Van IJzendoorn and colleagues conducted several correlational studies documenting the role of OXTR in parenting, and carried out various randomized control trials showing that oxytocin enhances male and female sensitivity to child signals, in natural play settings as well as with a cry test, using behavioural assessments, EEG/ERP, and fMRI. A meta-analysis of experimental studies with intranasal oxytocin administration was conducted showing that feelings of trust are elevated and that the expected lowering of out-group trust was not confirmed.

=== Child maltreatment ===
The first nationwide prevalence study of child maltreatment in the Netherlands (NPM-2005) was designed as a replication of the National Incidence Studies conducted in the United States. It was followed by the second National Prevalence Study on Maltreatment (NPM-2010).

At the request of the Dutch Ministry of Health, Welfare and Sport and the Dutch Ministry of Justice ("commissie Samsom"), a study on the prevalence of sexual abuse in youth living in out-of-home care was conducted in the Netherlands in 2008–2010.

=== Holocaust ===
Van IJzendoorn has been personally interested and deeply involved in a series of studies on the Holocaust, including the (long-term) effects on the first, second, and third generation of Holocaust survivors. In one of the first studies that avoided recruitment of participants through convenience groups (e.g., mental health clinics, Holocaust-related organizations, and advertisements), basic population-wide demographic information provided by the Israeli Ministry of the Interior were used to invite participants. It was shown that Holocaust survivors (now grandmothers) had more signs of traumatic stress and, more often, lack of resolution of trauma than comparison subjects, but they were not impaired in their general adaptation. Also, the traumatic effects did not appear to transmit across generations. Thus, Holocaust survivors may have been able to protect their daughters from their war experiences, although they themselves still suffer from the effects of the Holocaust.

In the first population-based retrospective cohort study of the Holocaust, it was tested whether surviving genocidal experiences, like the Holocaust, leads to shorter life-expectancy. However, against all odds, it was found that genocidal survivors were likely to live longer. Differential mortality during the Holocaust and "posttraumatic growth" associated with protective factors in Holocaust survivors or in their environment after World War II were suggested as explanations for these findings.

== Selected publications ==
- Verhage, M.L.; Schuengel, C.; Madigan, S.; Fearon, R.M.; Oosterman, M.; Cassiba, R.; Bakermans-Kranenburg, M.J.; van IJzendoorn, M.H. (2016). "Narrowing the transmission gap: A systhesis of three decades of research on intergenerational transmission of attachment". Psychological Bulletin. 142 (4): 337–366. doi:10.1037/bul0000038. hdl:1871.1/6f48da5f-0a59-436d-966e-c9f68ed975b2. PMID 26653864. S2CID 4380285.
- Bakermans-Kranenburg, M.J.; Van IJzendoorn, M.H. (2015). "The hidden efficacy of interventions: Gene x Environment experiments from a differential susceptibility perspective". Annual Review of Psychology. 66: 381–409. doi:10.1146/annurev-psych-010814-015407. PMID 25148854.
- Kok, R.; Thijssen, S.; Bakermans-Kranenburg; Jaddoe, V.W.V.; Verhulst, F.C.; White, T.; Van IJzendoorn, M.H.; Tiemeier, H. (2015). "Normal variation in early parental sensitivity predicts child structural brain development". Journal of the American Academy of Child & Adolescent Psychiatry. 54 (10): 824–831. doi:10.1016/j.jaac.2015.07.009. PMID 26407492.
- Sagi-Schwartz, A.; Bakermans-Kranenburg; Linn, S.; Van IJzendoorn, M.H. (2013). "Against all odds: Genocidal trauma is associated with longer life-expectancy of the survivors". PLOS ONE. 8 (7) e69179. Bibcode:2013PLoSO...869179S. doi:10.1371/journal.pone.0069179. PMC 3722177. PMID 23894427.
- Van IJzendoorn, M. H.; Bakermans-Kranenburg (2015). "Genetic differential susceptibility on trial: Meta-analytic support from randomized controlled experiments". Development and Psychopathology. 27 (1): 151–162. doi:10.1017/S0954579414001369. PMID 25640837.
