= Gene–environment interaction =

Response to the same environmental variation differently by different genotypes

Gene–environment interaction (or genotype–environment interaction or G×E) is when two different genotypes respond to environmental variation in different ways. A norm of reaction is a graph that shows the relationship between genes and environmental factors when phenotypic differences are continuous. They can help illustrate GxE interactions. When the norm of reaction is not parallel, as shown in the figure below, there is a gene by environment interaction. This indicates that each genotype responds to environmental variation in a different way. Environmental variation can be physical, chemical, biological, behavior patterns or life events.

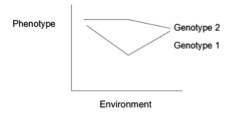
This norm of reaction shows lines that are not parallel indicating a gene by environment interaction. Each genotype is responding to environmental variation in a different way.

Gene–environment interactions are studied to gain a better understanding of various phenomena. In genetic epidemiology, gene–environment interactions are useful for understanding some diseases. Sometimes, sensitivity to environmental risk factors for a disease are inherited rather than the disease itself being inherited. Individuals with different genotypes are affected differently by exposure to the same environmental factors, and thus gene–environment interactions can result in different disease phenotypes. For example, sunlight exposure has a stronger influence on skin cancer risk in fair-skinned humans than in individuals with darker skin.

These interactions are of particular interest to genetic epidemiologists for predicting disease rates and methods of prevention with respect to public health. The term is also used amongst developmental psychobiologists to better understand individual and evolutionary development.

Nature versus nurture debates assume that variation in a trait is primarily due to either genetic differences or environmental differences. However, the current scientific opinion holds that neither genetic differences nor environmental differences are solely responsible for producing phenotypic variation, and that virtually all traits are influenced by both genetic and environmental differences.

Statistical analysis of the genetic and environmental differences contributing to the phenotype would have to be used to confirm these as gene–environment interactions. In developmental genetics, a causal interaction is enough to confirm gene–environment interactions.

== History of the definition ==
The history of defining gene–environment interaction dates back to the 1930s and remains a topic of debate today. The first instance of debate occurred between Ronald Fisher and Lancelot Hogben. Fisher sought to eliminate interaction from statistical studies as it was a phenomenon that could be removed using a variation in scale. Hogben believed that the interaction should be investigated instead of eliminated as it provided information on the causation of certain elements of development.

A similar argument faced multiple scientists in the 1970s. Arthur Jensen published the study "How much can we boost IQ and scholastic achievement?", which amongst much criticism also faced contention by scientists Richard Lewontin and David Layzer. Lewontin and Layzer argued that in order to conclude causal mechanisms, the gene–environment interaction could not be ignored in the context of the study while Jensen defended that interaction was purely a statistical phenomenon and not related to development.

Around the same time, Kenneth J. Rothman supported the use of a statistical definition for interaction while researchers Kupper and Hogan believed the definition and existence of interaction was dependent on the model being used.

The most recent criticisms were spurred by Moffitt and Caspi's studies on 5-HTTLPR and stress and its influence on depression. In contrast to previous debates, Moffitt and Caspi were now using the statistical analysis to prove that interaction existed and could be used to uncover the mechanisms of a vulnerability trait. Contention came from Zammit, Owen and Lewis who reiterated the concerns of Fisher in that the statistical effect was not related to the developmental process and would not be replicable with a difference of scale.

== Definitions ==
There are two different conceptions of gene–environment interaction today. Tabery has labeled them biometric and developmental interaction, while Sesardic uses the terms statistical and commonsense interaction.

The biometric (or statistical) conception has its origins in research programs that seek to measure the relative proportions of genetic and environmental contributions to phenotypic variation within populations. Biometric gene–environment interaction has particular currency in population genetics and behavioral genetics. Any interaction results in the breakdown of the additivity of the main effects of heredity and environment, but whether such interaction is present in particular settings is an empirical question. Biometric interaction is relevant in the context of research on individual differences rather than in the context of the development of a particular organism.

Developmental gene–environment interaction is a concept more commonly used by developmental geneticists and developmental psychobiologists. Developmental interaction is not seen merely as a statistical phenomenon. Whether statistical interaction is present or not, developmental interaction is in any case manifested in the causal interaction of genes and environments in producing an individual's phenotype.

== Epidemiological models of GxE ==
In epidemiology, the following models can be used to group the different interactions between gene and environment.

Model A describes a genotype that increases the level of expression of a risk factor but does not cause the disease itself. For example, the PKU gene results in higher levels of phenylalanine than normal which in turn causes intellectual disability.

The risk factor in Model B in contrast has a direct effect on disease susceptibility which is amplified by the genetic susceptibility. Model C depicts the inverse, where the genetic susceptibility directly effects disease while the risk factor amplifies this effect. In each independent situation, the factor directly effecting the disease can cause disease by itself.

Model D differs as neither factor in this situation can effect disease risk, however, when both genetic susceptibility and risk factor are present the risk is increased. For example, the G6PD deficiency gene when combined with fava bean consumption results in hemolytic anemia. This disease does not arise in individuals that eat fava beans and lack G6PD deficiency nor in G6PD-deficient people who do not eat fava beans.

Lastly, Model E depicts a scenario where the environmental risk factor and genetic susceptibility can individually both influence disease risk. When combined, however, the effect on disease risk differs.

The models are limited by the fact that the variables are binary and so do not consider polygenic or continuous scale variable scenarios.

== Methods of analysis ==
=== Traditional genetic designs ===
==== Adoption studies ====
Adoption studies have been used to investigate how similar individuals that have been adopted are to their biological parents with whom they did not share the same environment with. Additionally, adopted individuals are compared to their adoptive family due to the difference in genes but shared environment. For example, an adoption study showed that Swedish men with disadvantaged adoptive environments and a genetic predisposition were more likely to abuse alcohol.

==== Twin studies ====
Using monozygotic twins, the effects of different environments on identical genotypes could be observed. Later studies leverage biometrical modelling techniques to include the comparisons of dizygotic twins to ultimately determine the different levels of gene expression in different environments.

==== Family studies ====
Family-based research focuses on the comparison of low-risk controls to high risk children to determine the environmental effect on subjects with different levels of genetic risk. For example, a Danish study on high-risk children with mothers who had schizophrenia depicted that children without a stable caregiver were associated with an increased risk of schizophrenia.

=== Molecular analyses ===
==== Interaction with single genes ====
The often used method to detect gene–environment interactions is by studying the effect a single gene variation (candidate gene) has with respect to a particular environment. Single nucleotide polymorphisms (SNP's) are compared with single binary exposure factors to determine any effects.

Candidate studies such as these require strong biological hypotheses which are currently difficult to select given the little understanding of biological mechanisms that lead to higher risk.

These studies are also often difficult to replicate commonly due to small sample sizes which typically results in disputed results.

The polygenic nature of complex phenotypes suggests single candidate studies could be ineffective in determining the various smaller scale effects from the large number of influencing gene variants.

==== Interaction with multiple genes ====
Since the same environmental factor could interact with multiple genes, a polygenic approach can be taken to analyze GxE interactions. A polygenic score is generated using the alleles associated with a trait and their respective weights based on effect and examined in combination with environmental exposure. Though this method of research is still early, it is consistent with psychiatric disorders. As a result of the overlap of endophenotypes amongst disorders this suggests that the outcomes of gene–environment interactions are applicable across various diagnoses.

==== Genome-wide association studies and genome wide interaction studies ====
A genome wide interaction scan (GEWIS) approach examines the interaction between the environment and a large number of independent SNP's. An effective approach to this all-encompassing study occurs in two-steps where the genome is first filtered using gene-level tests and pathway based gene set analyses. The second step uses the SNP's with G–E association and tests for interaction.

The differential susceptibility hypothesis has been reaffirmed through genome wide approaches.

== Controversies ==
=== Lack of replication ===
A particular concern with gene–environment interaction studies is the lack of reproducibility. Specifically complex traits studies have come under scrutiny for producing results that cannot be replicated. For example, studies of the 5-HTTLPR gene and stress resulting in modified risk of depression have had conflicting results.

A possible explanation behind the inconsistent results is the heavy use of multiple testing. Studies are suggested to produce inaccurate results due to the investigation of multiple phenotypes and environmental factors in individual experiments.

=== Additive vs multiplicative model ===
There are two different models for the scale of measurement that helps determine if gene–environment interaction exists in a statistical context. There is disagreement on which scale should be used. Under these analyses, if the combined variables fit either model then there is no interaction. The combined effects must either be greater for synergistic or less than for an antagonistic outcome. The additive model measures risk differences while the multiplicative model uses ratios to measure effects. The additive model has been suggested to be a better fit for predicting disease risk in a population while a multiplicative model is more appropriate for disease etiology.

Epigenetics is an example of an underlying mechanism of gene–environment effects, however, it does not conclude whether environment effects are additive, multiplicative or interactive.

== Gene "×" environment "×" environment interactions ==
New studies have also revealed the interactive effect of multiple environment factors. For example, a child with a poor quality environment would be more sensitive to a poor environment as an adult which ultimately led to higher psychological distress scores. This depicts a three way interaction Gene x Environment x Environment. The same study suggests taking a life course approach to determining genetic sensitivity to environmental influences within the scope of mental illnesses.

== Medical significance ==
Doctors are interested in knowing whether disease can be prevented by reducing exposure to environmental risks. Some people carry genetic factors that confer susceptibility or resistance to a certain disorder in a particular environment. The interaction between the genetic factors and environmental stimulus is what results in the disease phenotype. There may be significant public health benefits in using gene by environment interactions to prevent or cure disease.

An individual's response to a drug can result from various gene by environment interactions. Therefore, the clinical importance of pharmacogenetics and gene by environment interactions comes from the possibility that genomic, along with environmental information, will allow more accurate predictions of an individual's drug response. This would allow doctors to more precisely select a certain drug and dosage to achieve therapeutic response in a patient while minimizing side effects and adverse drug reactions. This information could also help to prevent the health care costs associated with adverse drug reactions and inconveniently prescribing drugs to patients who likely won't respond to them.

In a similar manner, an individual can respond to other environmental stimuli, factors or challenges differently according to specific genetic differences or alleles. These other factors include the diet and specific nutrients within the diet, physical activity, alcohol and tobacco use, sleep (bed time, duration), and any of a number of exposures (or exposome), including toxins, pollutants, sunlight (latitude north–south of the equator), among any number of others. The diet, for example, is modifiable and has significant impact on a host of cardiometabolic diseases, including cardiovascular disease, coronary artery disease, coronary heart disease, type 2 diabetes, hypertension, stroke, myocardial infarction, and non-alcoholic fatty liver disease. In the clinic, typically assessed risks of these conditions include blood lipids (triglyceride, and HDL, LDL and total cholesterol), glycemic traits (plasma glucose and insulin, HOMA-IR, beta cell function as HOMA-BC), obesity anthropometrics (BMI/obesity, adiposity, body weight, waist circumference, waist-to-hip ratio), vascular measures (diastolic and systolic blood pressure), and biomarkers of inflammation. Gene–environment interactions can modulate the adverse effects of an allele that confers increased risk of disease, or can exacerbate the genotype–phenotype relationship and increase risk, in a manner often referred to as nutrigenetics. A catalog of genetic variants that associate with these and related cardiometabolic phenotypes and modified by common environmental factors is available.

Conversely, a disease study using breast cancer, type 2 diabetes, and rheumatoid arthritis shows that including GxE interactions in a risk prediction model does not improve risk identification.

== Examples ==
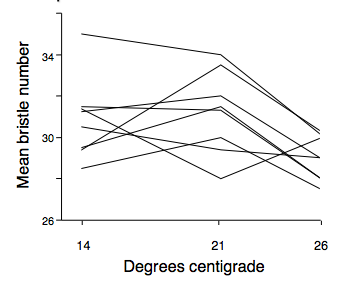
Mean bristle number by °C

1. In Drosophila: A classic example of gene–environment interaction was performed on Drosophila by Gupta and Lewontin in 1981. In their experiment they demonstrated that the mean bristle number on Drosophila could vary with changing temperatures. As seen in the graph to the right, different genotypes reacted differently to the changing environment. Each line represents a given genotype, and the slope of the line reflects the changing phenotype (bristle number) with changing temperature. Some individuals had an increase in bristle number with increasing temperature while others had a sharp decrease in bristle number with increasing temperature. This showed that the norms of reaction were not parallel for these flies, proving that gene–environment interactions exist.
2. In plants: One very interesting approach about genotype by environment interaction strategies is its use in the selection of sugarcane cultivars adapted to different environments. In this article, they analyzed twenty sugarcane genotypes grown in eight different locations over two crop cycles to identify mega-environments related to higher cane yield, measured in tons of cane per hectare (TCH) and percentage of sucrose (Pol% cane) using biplot multivariate GEI models. The authors then created a novel strategy to study both yield variables in a two-way coupled strategy even though the results showed a mean negative correlation. Through coinertia analysis, it was possible to determine the best-fitted genotypes for both yield variables in all environments. The use of these novel strategies like coinertia in GEI, proved to be a great complement analysis to AMMI and GGE, especially when the yield improvement implies multiple yield variables. Seven genetically distinct yarrow plants were collected and three cuttings taken from each plant. One cutting of each genotype was planted at low, medium, and high elevations, respectively. When the plants matured, no one genotype grew best at all altitudes, and at each altitude the seven genotypes fared differently. For example, one genotype grew the tallest at the medium elevation but attained only middling height at the other two elevations. The best growers at low and high elevation grew poorly at medium elevation. The medium altitude produced the worst overall results, but still yielded one tall and two medium-tall samples. Altitude had an effect on each genotype, but not to the same degree nor in the same way. A sorghum bi-parental population was repeatedly grown in seven diverse geographic locations across years. A group of genotypes requires similar growing degree-day (GDD) to flower across all environments, while another group of genotypes need less GDD in certain environments, but higher GDD in different environments to flower. The complex flowering time patterns is attributed to the interaction of major flowering time genes (Ma_{1}, Ma_{6}, FT, ELF3) and an explicit environmental factor, photothermal time (PTT) capturing the interaction between temperature and photoperiod.
3. Phenylketonuria (PKU) is a human genetic condition caused by mutations to a gene coding for a particular liver enzyme. In the absence of this enzyme, an amino acid known as phenylalanine does not get converted into the next amino acid in a biochemical pathway, and therefore too much phenylalanine passes into the blood and other tissues. This disturbs brain development leading to mental retardation and other problems. PKU affects approximately 1 out of every 15,000 infants in the U.S. However, most affected infants do not grow up impaired because of a standard screening program used in the U.S. and other industrialized societies. Newborns found to have high levels of phenylalanine in their blood can be put on a special, phenylalanine-free diet. If they are put on this diet right away and stay on it, these children avoid the severe effects of PKU. This example shows that a change in environment (lowering Phenylalanine consumption) can affect the phenotype of a particular trait, demonstrating a gene–environment interaction.
4. A single nucleotide polymorphism rs1800566 in NAD(P)H Quinone Dehydrogenase 1 (NQO1) alters the risk of asthma and general lung injury upon interaction with NOx pollutants, in individuals with this mutation.
5. A functional polymorphism in the monoamine oxidase A (MAOA) gene promoter can moderate the association between early life trauma and increased risk for violence and antisocial behavior. Low MAOA activity is a significant risk factor for aggressive and antisocial behavior in adults who report victimization as children. Persons who were abused as children but have a genotype conferring high levels of MAOA expression are less likely to develop symptoms of antisocial behavior. These findings must be interpreted with caution, however, because gene association studies on complex traits are notorious for being very difficult to confirm.
6. In Drosophila eggs:
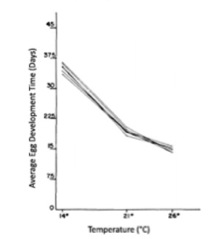
  Egg Development Time by Temperature
  Contrary to the aforementioned examples, length of egg development in Drosophila as a function of temperature demonstrates the lack of gene–environment interactions. The attached graph shows parallel reaction norms for a variety of individual Drosophila flies, showing that there is not a gene–environment interaction present between the two variables. In other words, each genotype responds similarly to the changing environment producing similar phenotypes. For all individual genotypes, average egg development time decreases with increasing temperature. The environment is influencing each of the genotypes in the same predictable manner.

== See also ==
- Biopsychosocial model
- Diathesis–stress model
- Differential susceptibility
- Environmental sensitivity
- Envirome
- Epidemiology
- Epigenetics
- Evolutionary developmental psychology
- Exposome
- Gene–environment correlation
- Genetic epidemiology
- Genomics
- Molecular epidemiology
- Molecular pathological epidemiology
- Molecular pathology
