= European Journal of Epidemiology =

- Discipline: Epidemiology
- Language: English
- Edited by: Albert Hofman

Publication details
- History: 1985–present
- Publisher: Springer Science+Business Media
- Frequency: Monthly
- Open access: Hybrid
- Impact factor: 8.082 (2020)

Standard abbreviations
- ISO 4: Eur. J. Epidemiol.

Indexing
- ISSN: 0393-2990 (print); 1573-7284 (web)
- OCLC no.: 740959212

Links
- Journal homepage; Online archive

The European Journal of Epidemiology is a monthly peer-reviewed medical journal covering the epidemiology of communicable and non-communicable diseases and their control. It is published by Springer Science+Business Media and the editor-in-chief is Albert Hofman (Harvard T.H. Chan School of Public Health). The journal was established in 1985 with Antiono Sanna as founding editor.

== Editors-in-chief ==
Sanna served as editor for 6 years, until 1992. He was succeeded by Carlo Chezzi (1992–1994), after which Claude Hannoun took over (1994–2002). Hannoun changed the direction of the journal, expanding the scope to include population health and non-communicable diseases. Finally, Albert Hofman became editor in 2002.

== Abstracting and indexing ==
The journal is abstracted and indexed in:

- AGRICOLA
- Biological Abstracts
- BIOSIS Previews
- Current Contents/Life Sciences
- Current Contents/Clinical Medicine
- EBSCO databases
- Elsevier Biobase
- Embase
- Food Science and Technology Abstracts
- Global Health
- Index Medicus/MEDLINE/PubMed
- INIS Atomindex
- PASCAL
- ProQuest databases
- Science Citation Index Expanded
- Scopus

According to the Journal Citation Reports, the journal has a 2018 impact factor of 6.529.
