= Richard Woltereck =

German zoologist

- Born: 6 April 1877; Hanover, German Empire
- Died: 23 February 1944 (aged 66); Seeon, Nazi Germany
- Education: University of Freiburg
- Known for: Reaction norm
- Awards: Member of the Academy of Sciences Leopoldina
- Scientific career
- Fields: Zoology
- Institutions: University of Leipzig
- Thesis: Zur Bildung und Entwicklung des Ostrakoden-Eies: kerngeschichtliche und biologische Studien an parthenogenetischen Cypriden (1898)
- Academic advisors: August Weismann

Richard Woltereck (6 April 1877 – 23 February 1944) was a German zoologist best known for developing the concept of reaction norm (German: Reaktionsnorm). He also conducted some of the first research that provided evidence for the process of cytoplasmic inheritance. He proposed the concept in a 1909 paper that he presented to the German Zoological Society, based on his own research on the Daphnia water flea. According to historian Raphael Falk, the concept of the reaction norm was later revived by Richard Lewontin.
