= Albert Hofman (epidemiologist) =

Dutch epidemiologist

Albert Hofman is a Dutch clinical epidemiologist. He is currently the Stephen B. Kay Family Professor of Public Health and the chair of the Department of Epidemiology at the Harvard T.H. Chan School of Public Health.

== Early life and education ==
Hofman was born in 1951 in Hardenberg, the Netherlands. He attended medical school at the University of Groningen and graduated in 1976 with his MD. He went on to complete a second research fellowship within the Department of Epidemiology at the Harvard School of Public Health in Boston, Massachusetts, in 1982. He then completed his PhD at the Erasmus University of Rotterdam in 1983.

== Career and Research ==
After earning his MD from the University of Groningen, Hofman went on to hold various fellowships at the Academic Hospitals Groningen and Leiden, and then in the Department of Epidemiology at the Harvard T.H. Chan School of Public Health. By 1988 he became chairman in the Department of Epidemiology, Erasmus Medical Center, the Netherlands. During his time there he became the initiator and Principal Investigator of two large population-based prospective cohort studies: the Rotterdam Study since 1990, and the Generation R study since 2002. His scientific research is focused on the causes of Alzheimer disease and stroke, and on life-course epidemiology of cardiovascular and neurological diseases. Much of his scientific work has been in the study of vascular factors in the etiology of Alzheimer disease and other dementias, in particular in the Rotterdam Study.

Since 1998 he became Professor of Epidemiology (adjunct) at the Harvard T.H. Chan School of Public Health and then in 2016 became the Stephen B. Kay Family Professor of Public Health and Clinical Epidemiology and Chair, Department of Epidemiology, Harvard T.H. Chan School of Public Health.

== Honors and distinctions ==
- 2002: Became member of the Royal Netherlands Academy of Arts and Sciences.
- 2017: Gave the Fourth Geoffrey Rose Memorial Guest Lecture at Imperial College, London, UK
- 2021: Royal Knighthood, Lion of the Netherlands, Kingdom of the Netherlands.
- 2024: In spring 2024 was a Fellow at The American Academy in Berlin.
- 2024: In the fall of 2024, received an honorary doctorate from University of Athens School of Medicine.

== Selected Publications ==
- Zhang WX, Cai WJ, Zhang YW, Hofman A, Viswanathan A, van Veluw SJ, Blacker D, Das S, May Y. Compression of cognitive decline and cognitive resilience in extreme longevity. Alzheimers Dementia. 2025 Oct;21(10):e70683. doi: 10.1002/alz.70683.
- Ma Y, Daniel Bos, Wolters FJ, Niessen W, Hofman A, Ikram MA, Vernooij MW. Changes in Cerebral Hemodynamics and Progression of Subclinical Vascular Brain Disease: A Population-Based Cohort Study. Stroke. 2025 Jan;56(1):95-104. doi: 10.1161/STROKEAHA.124.047593. Epub 2024 Dec 5.
- Lagou V, Jiang L, Ulrich A, Zudina L, González KSG, Balkhiyarova Z, Faggian A, Maina JG, Chen S, Todorov PV, Sharapov S, David A, Marullo L, Mägi R, Rujan RM, Ahlqvist E, Thorleifsson G, Gao Η, Εvangelou Ε, Benyamin B, Scott RA, Isaacs A, Zhao JH, Willems SM, Johnson T, Gieger C, Grallert H, Meisinger C, Müller-Nurasyid M, Strawbridge RJ, Goel A, Rybin D, Albrecht E, Jackson AU, Stringham HM, Corrêa IR Jr, Farber-Eger E, Steinthorsdottir V, Uitterlinden AG, Munroe PB, Brown MJ, Schmidberger J, Holmen O, Thorand B, Hveem K, Wilsgaard T, Mohlke KL, Wang Z; GWA-PA Consortium; Shmeliov A, den Hoed M, Loos RJF, Kratzer W, Haenle M, Koenig W, Boehm BO, Tan TM, Tomas A, Salem V, Barroso I, Tuomilehto J, Boehnke M, Florez JC, Hamsten A, Watkins H, Njølstad I, Wichmann HE, Caulfield MJ, Khaw KT, van Duijn CM, Hofman A, Wareham NJ, Langenberg C, Whitfield JB, Martin NG, Montgomery G, Scapoli C, Tzoulaki I, Elliott P, Thorsteinsdottir U, Stefansson K, Brittain EL, McCarthy MI, Froguel P, Sexton PM, Wootten D, Groop L, Dupuis J, Meigs JB, Deganutti G, Demirkan A, Pers TH, Reynolds CA, Aulchenko YS, Kaakinen MA, Jones B, Prokopenko I; Meta-Analysis of Glucose and Insulin-Related Traits. GWAS of random glucose in 478,326 individuals provide insights into diabetes pathophysiology, complications and treatment stratification. Nat Genet. 2023 Sep;55(9):1448-1461. doi: 10.1038/s41588-023-01462-3. Epub 2023 Sep 7. PMID 37679419.
- Waziry R, Claus JJ, Hofman A. Dementia Risk Following Ischemic Stroke: A Systematic Review and Meta-Analysis of Factors Collected at Time of Stroke Diagnosis. J Alzheimers Dis. 2022;90(4):1535-1546. doi: 10.3233/JAD-220317.
- Ma Y, He FJ, Sun Q, Yuan C, Kieneker LM, Curhan GC, MacGregor GA, Bakker SJL, Campbell NRC, Wang M, Rimm EB, Manson JE, Willett WC, Hofman A, Gansevoort RT, Cook NR, Hu FB. 24-Hour Urinary Sodium and Potassium Excretion and Cardiovascular Risk. N Engl J Medicine. 2022 Jan 20;386(3):252-263. doi: 10.1056/NEJMoa2109794. Epub 2021 Nov 13.PMID 34767706.
- Wolters FJ, Chibnik LB, Waziry R, Anderson R, Berr C, Beiser A, Bis JC, Blacker D, Bos D, Brayne C, Dartigues JF, Darweesh SKL, Davis-Plourde KL, de Wolf F, Debette S, Dufouil C, Fornage M, Goudsmit J, Grasset L, Gudnason V, Hadjichrysanthou C, Helmer C, Ikram MA, Ikram MK, Joas E, Kern S, Kuller LH, Launer L, Lopez OL, Matthews FE, McRae-Mckee K, Meirelles O, Mosely Jr, TH, Pase MP, Psaty BM, Satizabal CL, Seshadri S, Skoog I, Stephan BCM, Wetterberg H, Wong MM, Zettergren A, Hofman A. Twenty-seven-year time trends in dementia incidence in Europe and the United States: The Alzheimer Cohorts Consortium. Neurology. 2020 Aug 4;95(5):e519-e531. doi: 10.1212/WNL.0000000000010022. Epub 2020 Jul 1.
- Ma Y, Wolters FJ, Chibnik LB, Licher S, Ikram MA, Hofman A, Ikram MK. Variation in blood pressure and long-term risk of dementia: A population-based cohort study. PLoS Med. 2019 Nov 12;16(11):e1002933. doi: 10.1371/journal.pmed.1002933. eCollection 2019 Nov.
- Satizabal CL, Adams HHH, Hibar DP, White CC, Knol MJ, Stein JL, Scholz M, Sargurupremraj M, Jahanshad N, Roshchupkin GV, Smith AV, Bis JC, Jian X, Luciano M, Hofer E, Teumer A, van der Lee SJ, Yang J, Yanek LR, Lee TV, Li S, Hu Y, Koh JY, Eicher JD, Desrivières S, Arias-Vasquez A, Chauhan G, Athanasiu L, Rentería ME, Kim S, Hoehn D, Armstrong NJ, Chen Q, Holmes AJ, den Braber A, Kloszewska I, Andersson M, Espeseth T, Grimm O, Abramovic L, Alhusaini S, Milaneschi Y, Papmeyer M, Axelsson T, Ehrlich S, Roiz-Santiañez R, Kraemer B, Håberg AK, Jones HJ, Pike GB, Stein DJ, Stevens A, Bralten J, Vernooij MW, Harris TB, Filippi I, Witte AV, Guadalupe T, Wittfeld K, Mosley TH, Becker JT, Doan NT, Hagenaars SP, Saba Y, Cuellar-Partida G, Amin N, Hilal S, Nho K, Mirza-Schreiber N, Arfanakis K, Becker DM, Ames D, Goldman AL, Lee PH, Boomsma DI, Lovestone S, Giddaluru S, Le Hellard S, Mattheisen M, Bohlken MM, Kasperaviciute D, Schmaal L, Lawrie SM, Agartz I, Walton E, Tordesillas-Gutierrez D, Davies GE, Shin J, Ipser JC, Vinke LN, Hoogman M, Jia T, Burkhardt R, Klein M, Crivello F, Janowitz D, Carmichael O, Haukvik UK, Aribisala BS, Schmidt H, Strike LT, Cheng CY, Risacher SL, Pütz B, Fleischman DA, Assareh AA, Mattay VS, Buckner RL, Mecocci P, Dale AM, Cichon S, Boks MP, Matarin M, Penninx BWJH, Calhoun VD, Chakravarty MM, Marquand AF, Macare C, Kharabian Masouleh S, Oosterlaan J, Amouyel P, Hegenscheid K, Rotter JI, Schork AJ, Liewald DCM, de Zubicaray GI, Wong TY, Shen L, Sämann PG, Brodaty H, Roffman JL, de Geus EJC, Tsolaki M, Erk S, van Eijk KR, Cavalleri GL, van der Wee NJA, McIntosh AM, Gollub RL, Bulayeva KB, Bernard M, Richards JS, Himali JJ, Loeffler M, Rommelse N, Hoffmann W, Westlye LT, Valdés Hernández MC, Hansell NK, van Erp TGM, Wolf C, Kwok JBJ, Vellas B, Heinz A, Olde Loohuis LM, Delanty N, Ho BC, Ching CRK, Shumskaya E, Singh B, Hofman A, van der Meer D, Homuth G, Psaty BM, Bastin ME, Montgomery GW, Foroud TM, Reppermund S, Hottenga JJ, Simmons A, Meyer-Lindenberg A, Cahn W, Whelan CD, van Donkelaar MMJ, Yang Q, Hosten N, Green RC, Thalamuthu A, Mohnke S, Hulshoff Pol HE, Lin H, Jack CR Jr, Schofield PR, Mühleisen TW, Maillard P, Potkin SG, Wen W, Fletcher E, Toga AW, Gruber O, Huentelman M, Davey Smith G, Launer LJ, Nyberg L, Jönsson EG, Crespo-Facorro B, Koen N, Greve DN, Uitterlinden AG, Weinberger DR, Steen VM, Fedko IO, Groenewold NA, Niessen WJ, Toro R, Tzourio C, Longstreth WT Jr, Ikram MK, Smoller JW, van Tol MJ, Sussmann JE, Paus T, Lemaître H, Schroeter ML, Mazoyer B, Andreassen OA, Holsboer F, Depondt C, Veltman DJ, Turner JA, Pausova Z, Schumann G, van Rooij D, Djurovic S, Deary IJ, McMahon KL, Müller-Myhsok B, Brouwer RM, Soininen H, Pandolfo M, Wassink TH, Cheung JW, Wolfers T, Martinot JL, Zwiers MP, Nauck M, Melle I, Martin NG, Kanai R, Westman E, Kahn RS, Sisodiya SM, White T, Saremi A, van Bokhoven H, Brunner HG, Völzke H, Wright MJ, van 't Ent D, Nöthen MM, Ophoff RA, Buitelaar JK, Fernández G, Sachdev PS, Rietschel M, van Haren NEM, Fisher SE, Beiser AS, Francks C, Saykin AJ, Mather KA, Romanczuk-Seiferth N, Hartman CA, DeStefano AL, Heslenfeld DJ, Weiner MW, Walter H, Hoekstra PJ, Nyquist PA, Franke B, Bennett DA, Grabe HJ, Johnson AD, Chen C, van Duijn CM, Lopez OL, Fornage M, Wardlaw JM, Schmidt R, DeCarli C, De Jager PL, Villringer A, Debette S, Gudnason V, Medland SE, Shulman JM, Thompson PM, Seshadri S, Ikram MA. Genetic architecture of subcortical brain structures in 38,851 individuals. Nat Genet. 2019 Nov;51(11):1624-1636. doi: 10.1038/s41588-019-0511-y. Epub 2019 Oct 21.
- Chibnik LB, Wolters FJ, Bäckman K, Beiser A, Berr C, Bis JC, Boerwinkle E, Bos D, Brayne C, Dartigues JF, Darweesh SKL, Debette S, Davis-Plourde KL, Dufouil C, Fornage M, Grasset L, Gudnason V, Hadjichrysanthou C, Helmer C, Ikram MA, Ikram MK, Kern S, Kuller LH, Launer L, Lopez OL, Matthews F, Meirelles O, Mosley T, Ower A, Psaty BM, Satizabal CL, Seshadri S, Skoog I, Stephan BCM, Tzourio C, Waziry R, Wong MM, Zettergren A, Hofman A. Trends in the incidence of dementia: design and methods in the Alzheimer Cohorts Consortium. Eur J Epidemiol. 2017 Oct;32(10):931-938. doi: 10.1007/s10654-017-0320-5. Epub 2017 Oct 23.
- Wolters FJ, Zonneveld HI, Hofman A, van der Lugt A, Koudstaal PJ, Vernooij MW, Ikram MA; Heart-Brain Connection Collaborative Research Group.
- Cerebral Perfusion and the Risk of Dementia: A Population-Based Study. Circulation. 2017 Aug 22;136(8):719-728. doi: 10.1161/CIRCULATIONAHA.117.027448. Epub 2017 Jun 6.
- Kavousi M, Desai CS, Ayers C, Blumenthal RS, Budoff MJ, Mahabadi AA, Ikram MA, van der Lugt A, Hofman A, Erbel R, Khera A, Geisel MH, Jöckel KH, Lehmann N, Hoffmann U, O'Donnell CJ, Massaro JM, Liu K, Möhlenkamp S, Ning H, Franco OH, Greenland P. Prevalence and Prognostic Implications of Coronary Artery Calcification in Low-Risk Women: A Meta-analysis. JAMA. 2016 Nov 22;316(20):2126-2134. doi: 10.1001/jama.2016.17020.
- Adams HH, Swanson SA, Hofman A, Ikram MA. Amyloid-β transmission or unexamined bias? Nature. 2016 Sep 15;537(7620):E7-9. doi: 10.1038/nature19086. No abstract available.
- Akoudad S, Wolters FJ, Viswanathan A, de Bruijn RF, van der Lugt A, Hofman A, Koudstaal PJ, Ikram MA, Vernooij MW. Association of Cerebral Microbleeds With Cognitive Decline and Dementia. JAMA Neurol. 2016 Aug 1;73(8):934-43. doi: 10.1001/jamaneurol.2016.1017.
- Darweesh SK, Koudstaal PJ, Stricker BH, Hofman A, Ikram MA. Trends in the Incidence of Parkinson Disease in the General Population: The Rotterdam Study. Am J Epidemiol. 2016 Jun 1;183(11):1018-26. doi: 10.1093/aje/kwv271. Epub 2016 Apr 29.
- Okbay A, Beauchamp JP, Fontana MA, et al. Genome-wide association study identifies 74 loci associated with educational attainment. Nature. 2016 May 26;533(7604):539-42. doi: 10.1038/nature17671. Epub 2016 May 11.
- Kavousi M, et al. Prevalence and Prognostic Implications of Coronary Artery Calcification in Low-Risk Women A Meta-analysis. JAMA. 2016;316(20):2126-2134.
- Adams HHH, et al. Amyloid-beta transmission or unexamined bias? Nature. 2016;537(7620):E7-E8.
- Kavousi M, et al. Comparison of application of the ACC/AHA Guidelines, Adult Treatment Panel III Guidelines, and European Society of Cardiology Guidelines for cardiovascular disease prevention in a European cohort. JAMA. 2014;311(14):1416-23.
- Van Dijk FS, et al. PLS3 mutations in X-linked osteoporosis with fractures. N Engl J Med. 2013 Oct 17;369(16):1529-36.
- Jonsson T, et al. Variant of TREM2 Associated with the Risk of Alzheimer's Disease. N Engl J Med. 2013;368:107-116.
- Rietveld CA, et al. GWAS of 126,559 individuals identifies genetic variants associated with educational attainment. Science. 2013 Jun 21;340(6139):1467-71.
- Den Ruijter HM, et al. Common carotid intima- media thickness measurements in cardiovascular risk prediction: a meta-analysis. JAMA. 2012 Aug 22;308(8):796-803.
- Schrijvers EM, Koudstaal PJ, Hofman A, Breteler MM. Plasma clusterin and the risk of Alzheimer disease. JAMA. 2011 Apr 6;305(13):1322-6.
- Solouki AM, et al. A genome-wide association study identifies a susceptibility locus for refractive errors and myopia at 15q14. Nat Genet. 2010 Oct;42(10):897-901.
- Lp PLASC, et al. J. Lipoprotein-associated phospholipase A(2) and risk of coronary disease, stroke, and mortality: collaborative analysis of 32 prospective studies. Lancet. 2010 May 1;375(9725):1536-44.
- Ikram MA, et al. Genomewide association studies of stroke. N Engl J Med. 2009 Apr 23;360(17):1718-28.
- Newton-Cheh C, et al. Common variants at ten loci influence QT interval duration in the QTGEN Study. Nat Genet. 2009 Apr;41(4):399-406.
- Dehghan A, et al. Association of three genetic loci with uric acid concentration and risk of gout: a genome-wide association study. Lancet. 2008 Dec 6;372(9654):1953-61.
- Vernooij MW, et al. Incidental findings on brain MRI in the general population. N Engl J Med. 2007 Nov 1;357(18):1821-8.
- Meurs JB van, et al. Homocysteine levels and the risk of osteoporotic fracture. N Engl J Med 2004;350:2033-41.
- Vermeer SE, Prins ND, den Heijer T, Hofman A, Koudstaal PJ, Breteler MMB. Silent brain infarcts and the risk of dementia and cognitive decline. N Engl J Med. 2003;348:1215-22.
- Veld BA in ‘t, et al. Nonsteroidal antiinflammatory drugs and the risk of Alzheimer’s disease. N Engl J Med. 2001;345:1515-21.
- Uitterlinden AG, et al. Relation of alleles of the collagen type 11 gene to bone density and the risk of osteoporotic fractures in postmenopausal women. N Engl J Med. 1998;338:1016-21.
- Hofman A, et al. Atherosclerosis, apolipoprotein and prevalence of dementia and Alzheimer’s disease. The Rotterdam Study. Lancet. 1997;349:151-4.
- Will RG, et al. A new variant of Creutzfeldt-Jakob disease in the UK. Lancet. 1996;347:921-5.
- Duijn et al. Apolipoprotein E4 allele in a population based study of early onset Alzheimer’s disease. Nat Genet. 1994;7:74-9.
- Hendriks L, et al. Presenile-dementia and cerebral- hemorrhage linked to a mutation at codon-692 of the beta-amyloid precursor protein gene. Nat Genet. 1992;1:218-21.
- Hooft IMS van, et al. Renal hemodynamics and the renin-angiotensin-aldosterone system in the early phase of primary hypertension. N Engl J Med. 1991;324:1305-11.
- Walter HJ, Hofman A, Vaughan RD, Wynder E. Modification of risk factors for coronary heart disease. Five-year results of a school-based intervention trial. N Engl J Med. 1988;318:1093-100.
- Hofman A, Hazebroek A, Valkenburg HA. A randomized trial of sodium intake and blood pressure in newborn infants. JAMA. 1983;250:370-3.
