= Elaine Aron =

Psychologist and author

Elaine N. Aron
- Born: November 1, 1944 (age 81)
- Education: University of California, Berkeley; York University; Pacifica Graduate Institute
- Occupations: Psychologist; author
- Notable work: The Highly Sensitive Person (1996)
- Website: hsperson.com

Elaine N. Aron is an American clinical research psychologist and author. Aron has published numerous books and scholarly articles about inherited temperament and interpersonal relationships, especially on the subject of sensory processing sensitivity, beginning with The Highly Sensitive Person (1996), which has sold over a million copies.

== Education ==
Aron is known for research into sensory processing sensitivity (SPS) as graphically summarized by Greven et al. (review article, 2019). A person with a high measure of SPS is said to be a highly sensitive person (HSP).

Aron graduated Phi Beta Kappa from the University of California, Berkeley, and later earned a Master of Arts in clinical psychology from York University (Toronto) and a Ph.D. in clinical depth psychology at Pacifica Graduate Institute in Santa Barbara, California. She interned at the C. G. Jung Institute in San Francisco.

== Professional practice ==
Aron maintains a psychotherapy practice in Mill Valley, California.

In 1997, Aron and her husband published an academic paper called The Experimental Generation of Interpersonal Closeness: A Procedure and Some Preliminary Findings, in which the appendix featured a set of 36 questions of increasing intimacy. Participants who were strangers to each other were grouped in pairs to ask each other the questions, and found afterwards to develop a stronger friendship and in some cases even a relationship. In January 2015, New York Times writer Mandy Len Catron posted the article "To Fall In Love With Anyone, Do This" and listed them as the "36 questions that lead to love". The list has been used in hundreds of studies, to create closeness in a lab setting, to break down barriers between strangers, and improve understanding between police officers and community members.

== Published works ==
=== Books ===
- The Highly Sensitive Person: How to Thrive When the World Overwhelms You (1996)
- The Highly Sensitive Person's Workbook (1999)
- The Highly Sensitive Person in Love: Understanding and Managing Relationships When the World Overwhelms You (2001)
- The Highly Sensitive Child: Helping Our Children Thrive When the World Overwhelms Them (2002)
- The Undervalued Self: Restore Your Love/Power Balance, Transform the Inner Voice That Holds You Back, and Find Your True Self-Worth (2010)
- Psychotherapy and the Highly Sensitive Person: Improving Outcomes for That Minority of People Who Are the Majority of Clients (2010)
- The Highly Sensitive Person's Complete Learning Program: Essential Insights and Tools for Navigating Your Work, Relationships, and Life - Audiobook (2019)
- The Highly Sensitive Parent: Be Brilliant in Your Role, Even When the World Overwhelms You (2020)

=== Scholarly journal articles ===
- Aron, Elaine; Aron, Arthur (1997). "Sensory-Processing Sensitivity and its Relation to Introversion and Emotionality" (PDF). Journal of Personality and Social Psychology. 73 (2): 345–368. doi:10.1037/0022-3514.73.2.345. PMID 9248053. Archived (PDF) from the original on May 13, 2015.
- Aron, E. N.; Aron, A.; Davies, K. (2005). "Adult shyness: The interaction of temperamental sensitivity and an adverse childhood environment" (PDF). Personality and Social Psychology Bulletin. 31 (2): 181–197. doi:10.1177/0146167204271419. PMID 15619591. S2CID 1679620. Note 3 (p. 195) cites Chen et al. (1992) re social and cultural unacceptability adding to environmental stressors.
- Aron, Elaine N., Ph.D., (July 21, 2011) "Understanding the Highly Sensitivity Person: Sensitive, Introverted, or Both? | Extraverted HSPs face unique challenges" Psychology Today.
- Aron, Elaine N. (February 2, 2012). "Time Magazine: 'The Power of (Shyness)' and High Sensitivity". Psychology Today. Archived from the original on February 12, 2012.
- Aron, E.; Aron, A.; Jagiellowicz, J. (2012). "Sensory processing sensitivity: A review in the light of the evolution of biological responsivity" (PDF). Personality and Social Psychology Review. 16 (3): 262–282. doi:10.1177/1088868311434213. PMID 22291044. S2CID 2542035. Archived (PDF) from the original on May 13, 2015.
- Greven, Corina U.; Lionetti, Francesca; Booth, Charlotte; Aron, Elaine N.; et al. (March 2019). "Sensory Processing Sensitivity in the context of Environmental Sensitivity: A critical review and development of research agenda (Review article)". Neuroscience and Biobehavioral Reviews. 98. Elsevier: 287–305. doi:10.1016/j.neubiorev.2019.01.009. hdl:2066/202697. PMID 30639671.

=== Magazine articles ===
- Aron, Elaine N. (February 2, 2012). "Time Magazine: 'The Power of (Shyness)' and High Sensitivity". Psychology Today. Archived from the original on February 12, 2012.

== Personal life ==
Aron is married to SUNY-Stony Brook psychology professor Arthur Aron, with whom she collaborates in studies of the interaction of childhood environment with sensory processing sensitivity (SPS) in predicting adult functioning.

== See also ==
- Differential susceptibility hypothesis
- Personality psychology
- Social psychology
