= Institutional care =

Institutional care may refer to:

- Foster care
- Nursing home care
- Care at a retirement home
- Care at psychiatric hospitals, including:
  - Involuntary commitment
