= Reaction norm =

Aspect of gene expression

In ecology and genetics, a reaction norm, also called a norm of reaction, describes the pattern of phenotypic expression of a single genotype across a range of environments. One use of reaction norms is in describing how different species—especially related species—respond to varying environments. But differing genotypes within a single species may also show differing reaction norms relative to a particular phenotypic trait and environment variable. For every genotype, phenotypic trait, and environmental variable, a different reaction norm can exist; in other words, an enormous complexity can exist in the interrelationships between genetic and environmental factors in determining traits. The concept was introduced by Richard Woltereck in 1909.

== A monoclonal example ==
Approximately linear norms at opposite slopes

Scientifically analyzing norms of reaction in natural populations can be very difficult, simply because natural populations of sexually reproductive organisms usually do not have cleanly separated or superficially identifiable genetic distinctions. However, seed crops produced by humans are often engineered to contain specific genes, and in some cases seed stocks consist of clones. Accordingly, distinct seed lines present ideal examples of differentiated norms of reaction. In fact, agricultural companies market seeds for use in particular environments based on exactly this.

Suppose the seed line A contains an allele a, and a seed line B of the same crop species contains an allele b, for the same gene. With these controlled genetic groups, we might cultivate each variety (genotype) in a range of environments. This range might be either natural or controlled variations in environment. For example, an individual plant might receive either more or less water during its growth cycle, or the average temperature the plants are exposed to might vary across a range.

A simplification of the norm of reaction might state that seed line A is good for "high water conditions" while a seed line B is good for "low water conditions". But the full complexity of the norm of reaction is a function, for each genotype, relating environmental factor to phenotypic trait. By controlling for or measuring actual environments across which monoclonal seeds are cultivated, one can concretely observe norms of reaction. Normal distributions, for example, are common. Of course, the distributions need not be bell-curves.

== Reaction norm from an inbred population ==
One advantage of plants is that the same genotype, such as a recombinant inbred line (RIL), can be repeatedly evaluated in multiple environments, or a multi-environmental trial (MET). The reaction norm can then be explored based on the geographic location, mean trait value summarized from the whole population at each environment, or an explicit performance-free index capturing relevant environment inputs.

== Misunderstanding genetic/environmental interactions ==
Popular non-scientific or lay-scientific audiences frequently misunderstand or simply fail to recognize the existence of norms of reaction. A widespread conception is that each genotype gives a certain range of possible phenotypic expressions. In popular conception, something which is "more genetic" gives a narrower range, while something which is "less genetic (more environmental)" gives a wider range of phenotypic possibilities. This limited conceptual framework is especially prevalent in discussions of human traits such as IQ, sexual orientation, altruism, or schizophrenia (see Nature versus nurture).

Popular conception of genotype/phenotype interaction

                               TRAIT SCALE
<--6----------5----------4----------3----------2----------1----------0-->
    ^ (Genotype A) ^                                 ^ (Genotype B) ^
    |              |                                 |              |
 Environ <------> Other                           Environ <------> Other  
 extreme          extreme                         extreme          extreme

The problem with this common simplified image is not that it does not represent a possible norm of reaction. Rather, by reducing the picture from two dimensions to just one, it focuses only on discrete, non-overlapping phenotypic expressions, and hides the more common pattern of local minima and maxima in phenotypic expression, with overlapping ranges of phenotypic expression between genotypes.

== See also ==
- Canalisation (genetics)
- Differential susceptibility
- Genetic determinism
- Nature versus nurture
- Phenotypic plasticity
