= Diathesis–stress model =

Psychological theory

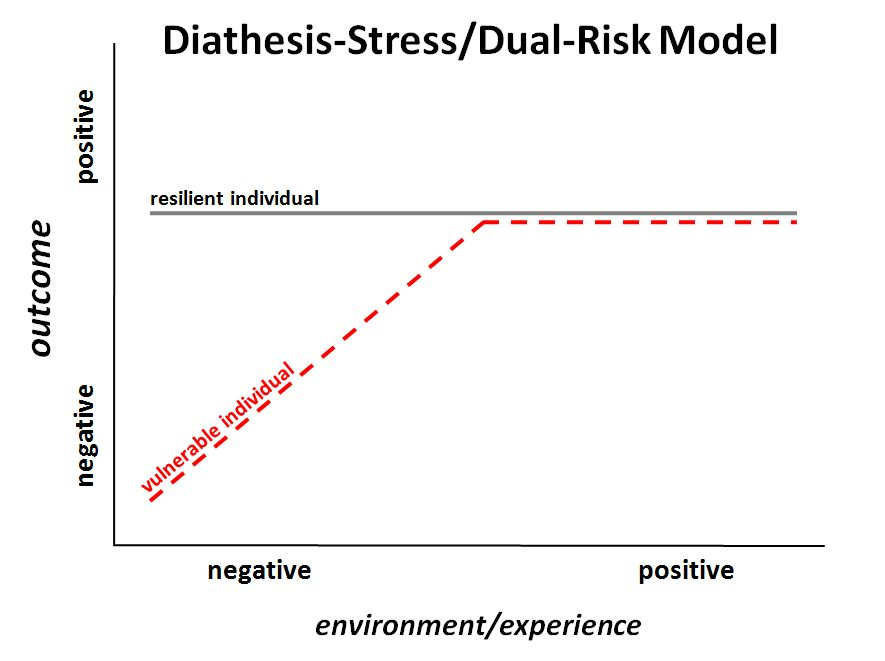
Schematic of diathesis–stress model

The diathesis–stress model, also known as the vulnerability–stress model, is a psychological theory that attempts to explain a disorder, or its trajectory, as the result of an interaction between a predispositional vulnerability, the diathesis, and stress caused by life experiences. The term diathesis derives from the Greek term (διάθεσις) for a predisposition or sensibility. A diathesis can take the form of genetic, psychological, biological, or situational factors. A large range of differences exists among individuals' vulnerabilities to the development of a disorder.

The diathesis, or predisposition, interacts with the individual's subsequent stress response. Stress is a life event or series of events that disrupt a person's psychological equilibrium and may catalyze the development of a disorder. Thus, the diathesis-stress model serves to explore how biological or genetic traits (diatheses) interact with environmental influences (stressors) to produce disorders such as depression, anxiety, or schizophrenia. The diathesis-stress model asserts that if the combination of the predisposition and the stress exceeds a threshold, the person will develop a disorder. The use of the term diathesis in medicine and in the specialty of psychiatry dates back to the 1800s. However, the diathesis-stress model was not introduced and used to describe the development of psychopathology until it was applied to explaining schizophrenia in the 1960s by Paul Meehl.

The diathesis-stress model is used in many fields of psychology, specifically for studying the development of psychopathology. It is useful for the purposes of understanding the interplay of nature and nurture in the susceptibility to psychological disorders throughout the lifespan. Diathesis-stress models can also assist in determining who will develop a disorder and who will not. For example, in the context of depression, the diathesis-stress model can help explain why Person A may become depressed while Person B does not, even when exposed to the same stressors. More recently, the diathesis-stress model has been used to explain why some individuals are more at risk for developing a disorder than others. For example, children who have a family history of depression are generally more vulnerable to developing a depressive disorder themselves. A child who has a family history of depression and who has been exposed to a particular stressor, such as exclusion or rejection by their peers, would be more likely to develop depression than a child with a family history of depression that has an otherwise positive social network of peers. The diathesis-stress model has also served as useful in explaining other poor (but non-clinical) developmental outcomes.

Protective factors, such as positive social networks or high self-esteem, can counteract the effects of stressors and prevent or curb the effects of the disorder. Many psychological disorders have a window of vulnerability, during which time an individual is more likely to develop a disorder than others. Diathesis–stress models are often conceptualized as multi-causal developmental models, which propose that multiple risk factors over the course of development interact with stressors and protective factors contributing to normal development or psychopathology. The differential susceptibility hypothesis is a recent theory that has stemmed from the diathesis–stress model.

== Diathesis ==
A cup analogy demonstrating under the same amount of stressors, person 2 is more vulnerable than person 1, because of their predisposition

The term diathesis is synonymous with vulnerability, and variants such as "vulnerability-stress" are common within psychology. A vulnerability makes it more or less likely that an individual will succumb to the development of psychopathology if certain stress is encountered. Diatheses are considered inherent within the individual and are typically conceptualized as being stable, but not unchangeable, over the lifespan. They are also often considered latent (i.e., dormant) because they are harder to recognize unless provoked by stressors.

Diatheses are understood to include genetic, biological, physiological, cognitive, and personality-related factors. Some examples of diatheses include genetic factors, such as abnormalities in some genes or variations in multiple genes that interact to increase vulnerability. Other diatheses include early life experiences such as the loss of a parent or high neuroticism. Diatheses can also be conceptualized as situational factors, such as low socioeconomic status or having a parent with depression.

== Stress ==
Stress can be conceptualized as a life event that disrupts the equilibrium of a person's life. For instance, a person may be vulnerable to becoming depressed but will not develop depression unless he or she is exposed to a specific stress, which may trigger a depressive disorder. Stressors can take the form of a discrete event, such as the divorce of parents or a death in the family, or can be more chronic factors such as having a long-term illness or ongoing marital problems. Stresses can also be related to more daily hassles, such as school assignment deadlines. This also parallels the popular (and engineering) usage of stress, but note that some literature defines stress as the response to stressors, especially where usage in biology influences neuroscience.

It has been long recognized that psychological stress plays a significant role in understanding how psychopathology develops in individuals. However, psychologists have also identified that not all individuals who are stressed, or go through stressful life events, develop a psychological disorder. To understand this, theorists and researchers explored other factors that affected the development of a disorder and proposed that some individuals under stress develop a disorder and others do not. As such, some individuals are more vulnerable than others to developing a disorder once the stress has been introduced. This led to the formulation of the diathesis-stress model.

== Genetics ==
Stress is known to be a mast cell activator. Mast cells are long-lived tissue-resident cells with an important role in many inflammatory settings, including host defense against parasitic infection and in allergic reactions.

There is evidence that "children exposed to prenatal stress may experience resilience driven by epigenome-wide interactions". Early life stress interactions with the epigenome show potential mechanisms driving vulnerability towards psychiatric illness. Ancestral stress alters lifetime mental health trajectories via epigenetic regulation.

Carriers of congenital adrenal hyperplasia have a predisposition to stress due to the unique nature of this gene. True rates of prevalence are not known, but common genetic variants of the human Steroid 21-Hydroxylase Gene (CYP21A2) are related to differences in circulating hormone levels in the population.

Psychological distress significantly impacts the quality of life of affected individuals. It is a known feature of generalized joint hypermobility (gJHM), as well as of its most common syndromic presentation, namely Ehlers–Danlos syndrome, hypermobility type (also known as joint hypermobility syndrome, JHS/EDS-HT). Interestingly, in addition to the confirmation of a tight link between anxiety and gJHM, preliminary connections with depression, attention deficit hyperactivity disorder (ADHD), autism spectrum disorders, and obsessive–compulsive personality disorder (OCPD) were also found.

Sensory processing sensitivity (SPS) is a personality trait involving "an increased sensitivity of the central nervous system and a deeper cognitive processing of physical, social and emotional stimuli". The trait is characterized by "a tendency to 'pause to check' in novel situations, greater sensitivity to subtle stimuli, and the engagement of deeper cognitive processing strategies for employing coping actions, all of which are driven by heightened emotional reactivity, both positive and negative". SPS captures sensitivity to the environment in a heritable, evolutionary-conserved trait associated with increased information processing in the brain, moderating sensitivity to environments in a for-better-and-for-worse fashion. Interaction with negative experiences increases the risk for psychopathology, whereas interaction with positive experiences (including interventions) increases positive outcomes.

== Protective factors ==
Equipped with more resource, the effect from different life stressors is buffered.

Protective factors, while not an inherent component of the diathesis–stress model, are of importance when considering the interaction of diatheses and stress. Protective factors can mitigate or provide a buffer against the effects of major stressors by providing an individual with developmentally adaptive outlets to deal with stress. Examples of protective factors include a positive parent-child attachment relationship, a supportive peer network, and individual social and emotional competence.

== Throughout the lifespan ==
Many models of psychopathology generally suggest that all people have some level of vulnerability towards certain mental disorders but posit a large range of individual differences in the point at which a person will develop a certain disorder. For example, an individual with personality traits that tend to promote relationships, such as extroversion and agreeableness, may engender strong social support, which may later serve as a protective factor when experiencing stressors or losses that may delay or prevent the development of depression. Conversely, an individual who finds it difficult to develop and maintain supportive relationships may be more vulnerable to developing depression following a job loss because they do not have protective social support. An individual's threshold is determined by the interaction of diatheses and stress.

Windows of vulnerability for developing specific psychopathologies are believed to exist at different points of the lifespan. Moreover, different diatheses and stressors are implicated in different disorders. For example, breakups and other severe or traumatic life stressors are implicated in the development of depression. Stressful events can also trigger the manic phase of bipolar disorder, and stressful events can then prevent recovery and trigger relapse. Having a genetic disposition for becoming addicted and later engaging in binge drinking in college are implicated in the development of alcoholism. A family history of schizophrenia combined with the stressor of being raised in a dysfunctional family raises the risk of developing schizophrenia.

Diathesis-stress models are often conceptualized as multi-causal developmental models, which propose that multiple risk factors over the course of development interact with stressors and protective factors contributing to normal development or psychopathology. For example, a child with a family history of depression likely has a genetic vulnerability to depressive disorder. This child has also been exposed to environmental factors associated with parental depression that increase their vulnerability to developing depression as well. Protective factors, such as a strong peer network, involvement in extracurricular activities, and a positive relationship with the non-depressed parent, interact with the child's vulnerabilities in determining the progression to psychopathology versus normative development.

Some theories have branched from the diathesis-stress model, such as the differential susceptibility hypothesis, which extends the model to include a vulnerability to positive environments as well as negative environments or stress. A person could have a biological vulnerability that, when combined with a stressor, could lead to psychopathology (diathesis–stress model); but that same person with a biological vulnerability, if exposed to a particularly positive environment, could have better outcomes than a person without the vulnerability.

== See also ==
- Biopsychosocial model
- Environmental sensitivity
- Gene–environment interaction
- Genetic predisposition
- Heritability
- Human behavior genetics
