= Infant Behavior and Development =

- Discipline: Developmental psychology
- Language: English
- Edited by: Martha E. Arterberry

Publication details
- History: 1978–present
- Publisher: Elsevier
- Frequency: Quarterly
- Impact factor: 1.669 (2017)

Standard abbreviations
- ISO 4: Infant Behav. Dev.

Indexing
- CODEN: IBDEDP
- ISSN: 0163-6383 (print); 1934-8800 (web)
- LCCN: 79643053
- OCLC no.: 639060060

Links
- Journal homepage; Online access; Online archive

Infant Behavior and Development is a quarterly peer-reviewed scientific journal covering developmental psychology in infants. It was established in 1978 and is published by Elsevier. The editor-in-chief is Martha E. Arterberry (Colby College). According to the Journal Citation Reports, the journal has a 2017 impact factor of 1.669.
