= Photothermal time =

Photothermal time (PTT) is a product between growing degree-days (GDD) and day length (hours) for each day. PTT = GDD × DL It can be used to quantify environment, as well as the timing of developmental stages of plants.
