= Generation R =

Dutch childhood study

Generation R is a prospective, population based cohort study from fetal life until young adulthood in a multi-ethnic urban population in Rotterdam, the Netherlands. The study is designed to identify early environmental and genetic causes of normal and abnormal growth, development and health. Eventually, results forthcoming from the Generation R Study have to contribute to the development of strategies for optimizing health and healthcare for pregnant women and children.

The study focuses on five primary areas of research:

- Growth and physical development
- Behavioral and cognitive development
- Asthma and atopy
- Diseases in childhood
- Health and healthcare

== Study cohort ==
The children form a prenatally recruited birth cohort that will be followed until young adulthood. In total, 9778 mothers with a delivery date from April 2002 until January 2006 were enrolled in the study. Of all eligible children at birth, 61% participate in the study. A large part of this study cohort consists of ethnic minorities.

== Data collection ==
Data collection in the prenatal phase included physical examinations, questionnaires, foetal ultrasound examinations and biological samples. In addition, more detailed assessments are conducted in a subgroup of 1232 pregnant women and their children. At the age of 5 years, all children were invited to visit the Generation R research centre for detailed assessments. This was repeated at the age of 9 years.

== Publications ==
A list of publications from the Generation R study.
