= Jay Belsky =

American developmental scientist (born 1952)

- Born: July 7, 1952 (age 74); New York City, New York
- Education: Cornell University (Ph.D., 1978)
- Known for: Work on evolutionary-developmental psychology (evo-devo) and effects of child care on children
- Awards: 1988 Boyd McCandless Award, 2007 Urie Bronfenbrenner Award, 2015 Bowlby-Ainsworth Award
- Scientific career
- Fields: Child psychology, developmental science
- Workplaces: University of California-Davis
- Thesis: Family interaction in toddlerhood: a naturalistic observational study (1978)

Jay Belsky (born July 7, 1952) is an American developmental scientist known for his research on early-life experiences, parenting, family processes, and evolutionary-developmental approaches to human development.

== Biography ==
Jay Belsky (born July 7, 1952) is an American developmental scientist known for his research on how early-life experiences shape later development and well-being. Before retiring in 2022, he served as the Robert M. and Natalie Reid Dorn Professor of Human Development at the University of California, Davis. His work spans parenting, family processes, non-parental childcare, and evolutionary-developmental approaches to human development. Belsky has been a founding investigator of two major longitudinal studies: the NICHD Study of Early Child Care and Youth Development in the United States and the National Evaluation of Sure Start in the United Kingdom.

== Career ==
After receiving his Ph.D. from Cornell University in 1978, Belsky joined the faculty of Penn State University, where he became a distinguished professor of human development before leaving in 1999. From 1999 to 2010, he was a professor of psychology at Birkbeck University of London, where he was also the founding director of the Institute for the Study of Children, Families and Social Issues. He became the Robert M. and Natalie Reid Dorn Professor of Human Development at the University of California, Davis in 2011. In 2022 he retired and became Emeritus Professor of Human Development.

== Research ==
Belsky's scholarly career has been principally focused on why, how, and for whom childhood experiences (e.g., harsh parenting) and environmental exposures (e.g., schooling) shape—or do not shape—children's development. This has led him to examine family, child care, schooling, and community effects, beginning in infancy and following children into adolescence and beyond.

=== Evolutionary‑developmental analysis ===
Belsky introduced evolutionary thinking into developmental discussions of nature and nurture. Advancing an evolutionary theory of socialization, he proposed the prediction that exposure to childhood adversity should accelerate pubertal development, thereby shaping adolescent and adult functioning. His differential‑susceptibility hypothesis further argued that children vary in their developmental plasticity, that is, the extent to which their childhood environments shape who they become.

This line of thinking led to the discovery that the children most likely to be negatively affected by adverse childhood experiences, due to personal characteristics such as genes, temperament, or physiology, were also the ones most likely to benefit from support and enrichment. Conversely, children with contrasting personal characteristics showed fewer effects of either adversity or support. Such findings shed light on why most efforts to prevent or remediate problems in children—or even teens and adults—rarely show the positive impact expected or desired.

=== Childcare and early education ===
Belsky was a founding investigator of the NICHD Study of Early Child Care and Youth Development in the United States and a principal investigator in the National Evaluation of Sure Start in the United Kingdom. He has published multiple studies reporting associations between extensive non‑parental childcare and increased risk of behavioral or socioemotional problems. These findings received substantial media attention, and were debated by other researchers. Kathleen McCartney argued in 1987 that "None of the studies Jay [Belsky] talks about look at the quality of child-care arrangements or the family backgrounds."

Findings from the NICHD Study, which followed more than 1,000 children from birth to age 15, indicated that higher quality childcare predicted somewhat better cognitive‑linguistic development and academic achievement. At the same time, greater quantity of care—more hours per week over months and years before school entry—predicted higher levels of aggressive and disobedient behavior in childhood and more risk‑taking and impulsivity in adolescence. These associations were not accounted for by childcare quality, nor by family, schooling, or neighborhood characteristics. Subsequent follow up when children were 18 years of age revealed that more time in child care across the first 4.5 years of life was associated with more severe and more frequent contacts with the police (i.e., arrests, time in jail, driving tickets, taffic accidents, including while under the influence of drugs or alcohol); and this was a result of earlier effects on adolescent impulsivity and risk-taking.

=== Parenting and family processes ===
Across his career, Belsky has examined how parenting behaviors, family dynamics, and early relational experiences shape children’s socioemotional and behavioral development. His work has included observational studies of parent–child interaction, analyses of family stress and marital functioning, and investigations of how early caregiving environments contribute to developmental trajectories.

He has studied how marriages change with the arrival of a first child and how these changes affect children’s development; the parenting origins of secure and insecure infant–parent attachments; the role of family processes in shaping peer relations; and a wide range of other family‑related topics.

=== The determinants of parenting ===
Drawing on his work identifying multiple parent, child, and contextual contributors to child abuse and neglect, Belsky extended these ideas to parenting in the normative range. His research demonstrated that the cumulative balance of risk and support best predicts variations in parenting behavior. Central to his theoretical model are parents’ personalities and childhood histories, children’s temperaments and related characteristics, and sources of social support and occupational experience. Together, these factors help explain why parents differ in how they respond to and care for their children.

== Books ==
- Belsky, J. (2026). The Nature of Nurture: Rethinking Why and How Childhood Adversity Shapes Development. Cambridge, MA: Harvard University Press.
- Belsky, J., Moffitt, T., Poulton, R., & Caspi, A. (2020). The Origins of You: How Childhood Shapes Later Life. Cambridge, MA: Harvard University Press. (Published in Japan, 2024, The English Agency.)
- Belsky, J., Barnes, J., & Melhuish, E. (Eds.). (2007). The National Evaluation of Sure Start: Does Area-based Early Intervention Work? Bristol, UK: The Policy Press. (Translated and published in Japan, 2013.)
- The NICHD Early Child Care Research Network (Ed.). (2005). Child Care and Child Development: Results from the NICHD Study of Early Child Care and Youth Development. New York, NY: The Guilford Press.

== Selected publications ==
- Belsky, J. (1980). Child Maltreatment: An Ecological Integration. American Psychologist, 35, 320–335.
- Belsky, J. (1984). The Determinants of Parenting. Child Development, 55, 83–96.
- Belsky, J., Steinberg, L., & Draper, P. (1991). Childhood Experience, Interpersonal Development, and Reproductive Strategy. Child Development, 62, 647–670.
- Belsky, J., & Pluess, M. (2009). Beyond Diathesis–Stress: Differential Susceptibility to Environmental Influences. Psychological Bulletin, 135, 885–908.
- Belsky, J., Vandell, D. Burchinal, M. Clarke-Stewart, K.A., McCartney, K., Owen, M. & The NICHD Early Child Care Research Network (2007). Are There Long-term Effects of Early Child Care? Child Development, 78, 681-701.
- Vandell, Simpkins, S.D., & Liu, Y. (2021). From early care and education to adult problem behaviors: A prevention pathway through after-school organized activities. Development and Psychopathology, 33(2), 658-669.
- Belsky, J., Zhang, X., & Sayler, K. (2022). Differential Susceptibility 2.0. Are the same children affected by different experiences and exposures Development and Psychopathology, 34, 1025-1033.
- Belsky, J. (2024). The Nature of Nurture: Darwinian and Mendelian Perspectives. Development and Psychopathology, 36, 2197-2206.
