= Trauma-informed care =

Therapeutic framework

Trauma-informed care (TIC), trauma-informed practice, or trauma-and violence-informed care (TVIC), is a framework for relating to and helping people who have experienced negative consequences after exposure to dangerous experiences. There is no one single TIC or TVIC framework or model. Various frameworks incorporate a number of perspectives, principles and skills. TIC frameworks can be applied in many contexts including medicine, mental health, law, education, architecture, addiction, gender, culture, and interpersonal relationships. They can be applied by individuals and organizations.

TIC principles emphasize the need to understand the scope of what constitutes danger and how resulting trauma impacts human health, thoughts, feelings, behaviors, communications, and relationships. People who have been exposed to life-altering danger need safety, choice, and support in healing relationships. Client-centered and capacity-building approaches are emphasized. Most frameworks incorporate a biopsychosocial perspective, attending to the integrated effects on biology (body and brain), psychology (mind), and sociology (relationship).

A basic view of trauma-informed care (TIC) involves developing a holistic appreciation of the potential effects of trauma with the goal of expanding the care-provider's empathy while creating a feeling of safety. Under this view, it is often stated that a trauma-informed approach asks not "What is wrong with you?" but rather "What happened to you?" A more expansive view includes developing an understanding of danger-response. In this view, danger is understood to be broad, include relationship dangers, and can be subjectively experienced. Danger exposure is understood to impact someone's past and present adaptive responses and information processing patterns.

== History ==
Trauma researchers Maxine Harris and Roger Fallot first articulated the concept of trauma-informed care (TIC) in 2001. They described trauma-informed as a vital paradigm shift, from focusing on the apparently immediate presenting problem to first considering past experience of trauma and violence. They focused on three primary issues: instituting universal trauma screening and assessment; not causing re-traumatization through the delivery methods of professional services; and promoting an understanding of the biopsychosocial nature and effects of trauma.

Researchers and government agencies immediately began expanding on the concept. In the 2000s, the Substance Abuse and Mental Health Services Administration (SAMHSA) in the United States began to measure the effectiveness of TIC programs. The U.S. Congress created the National Child Traumatic Stress Network, which SAMHSA administers. SAMHSA commissioned a longitudinal study, the Women, Co-Occurring Disorders and Violence Study (WCDVS) to produce empirical knowledge on the development and effectiveness of a comprehensive approach to help women with mental health, substance abuse, and trauma histories.

Several significant events happened in 2005. SAMHSA formed the National Center for Trauma-Informed Care. Elliott, Fallot and colleagues identified a consensus of 10 TIC concepts for working with individuals. They more finely parsed Harris and Fallot's earlier ideas, and included relational collaboration, strengths and resilience, cultural competence, and consumer input. They offered application examples, such as providing parenting support to create healing for parents and their children. Huntington and colleagues reviewed the WCDVS data, and working with a steering committee, they reached a consensus on a framework of four core principles for organizations to implement.

- Organizations and services must be integrated to meet the needs of the relevant population.
- Settings and services for this population must be trauma-informed.
- Consumer/survivor/recovering persons must be integrated into the design and provision of services.
- A comprehensive array of services must be made available.

In 2011 SAMHSA issued a policy statement that all mental health service systems should identify and apply TIC principles. The TIC concept expanded into specific disciplines such as education, child welfare agencies, homeless shelters, and domestic violence services. SAMHSA issued a more comprehensive statement about the TIC concept in 2014, described below.

The term trauma- and violence-informed care (TVIC) was first used by Browne and colleagues in 2014, in the context of developing strategies for primary health care organizations. In 2016, the Canadian Department of Justice published "Trauma- (and violence-) informed approaches to supporting victims of violence: Policy and practice considerations". Canadian researchers C. Nadine Wathen and Colleen Varcoe expanded and further detailed the TVIC concept in 2023.

In many ways TIC/TVIC concepts and models overlap or incorporate other models, and there is some debate about whether there is a difference. The confusion may be due to whether TIC is seen as a model instead of a framework or approach which brings in knowledge and techniques from other models. For example, most TIC frameworks incorporate a client/person-centered approach, which is fundamental to Rogerian and humanistic models, and foundational in ethical codes for lawyers and medical professionals.

Attachment-informed healing professionals conceptualize their essential role as being a transitional attachment figure (TAF), where they focus on providing protection from danger, safety, and appropriate comfort in the professional relationship.

TIC proponents argue the concept promotes a deeper awareness of the many forms of danger and trauma, and the scope and lifetime effects exposure to danger can cause. The prolific use of TIC may be evidence it is a practical and useful framework, concept, model, or set of strategies for helping-professionals.

== Types of trauma ==
Trauma can result from a wide range of experiences which expose humans to one or more physical, emotional, and/or relational dangers.

- Physical: Physical injury, brain injury, assault, crime, natural disaster, war, pain, and situational harm like vehicle or industrial accidents.
- Relational—adult: Interpersonal trauma, domestic violence, intimate partner violence, controlling behavior and coercive control, betrayal, gaslighting, DARVO, traumatic bonding, and intense emotional experiences such as shame and humiliation.
- Relational—child: For children, it can also involve childhood trauma, adverse childhood experiences, separation distress, and negative attachment experiences (controlling, dismissive, inconsistent, harsh, or harmful caregiving environments).
- Social/structural: Social and political, structural violence, racism, historical, collective, national, poverty, religious, educational, the various forms of slavery, and cultural environments.
- PTSD: Non-complex or complex post-traumatic stress disorder, and continuous traumatic stress.
- Psychological and pharmacological: Psychological harm, mental disorders, drug addiction, isolation, and solitary confinement.
- Secondary: Vicarious or secondary exposure to other's trauma.

Psychiatrist and PTSD researcher Bessel van der Kolk describes trauma as an experience and response to exposure to one or more overwhelming dangers, which causes harm to neurobiological functioning, and leaves a person with impaired ability to identify and manage dangers. This leaves them "constantly fighting unseen dangers".

Developmental psychologist Patricia Crittenden describes how relational dangers in childhood caregiving environments can cause chronic trauma: "Some parents are dangerous to their children. Stated more accurately, all parents harm their children more or less, just as all are more or less protective and comforting." Parenting, or caregiver, styles which are dismissive, inconsistent, harsh, abusive or expose children to other physical or relational dangers can cause a trauma which impairs neurodevelopment. Children adapt to achieve maximum caregiver protection, but the adaptation may be maladaptive if used in other relationships. The Dynamic-Maturational Model of Attachment and Adaptation (DMM) describes how children's repeated exposure to these dangers can result in lifespan impairments to information processing.

Adverse childhood experiences (ACE) scores are a common measure to assess trauma experienced by children and adults. A higher ACE score (number of trauma exposure types) is associated with an increased chance of developing chronic diseases or mental health conditions, as well an increased propensity to commit violent acts. Similarly, social determinants of health, such as economic insecurity, can also indicate increased risk for injury or development of trauma, contributing to a higher ACE score for individuals at high-risk for re-injury/traumatization.

Trauma is common. In a meta study of U.S. and international ACEs prevalence studies nearly two thirds of school-aged youth experienced significant adverse events. The prevalence rate varies by an individual trauma type. Emotional abuse and coercive control are as high as 80% and 84% respectively. In a meta study of interpersonal violence experienced by women 37% had experienced it in their lifetime. The effects are dimensional and can vary in scope and degree.

== TIC frameworks ==
There are many TIC-related concepts, principles, approaches, frameworks, or models, some general and some more context specific. Other terms include trauma-informed, trauma-informed approach, trauma-informed perspective, trauma-focused, trauma-based, trauma-sensitive, trauma-informed care/practice (TIC/P), and trauma-informed practice (TIP).

The U.S. government's Substance Abuse and Mental Health Services Administration (SAMHSA) is an agency which has given significant attention to trauma-informed care. SAMHSA sought to develop a broad definition of the concept. It starts with "the three E's of trauma": Event(s), Experience of events, and Effect. SAMHSA offers four assumptions about a TIC approach with the four R's: Realizing the widespread impact of trauma, Recognizing the signs and symptoms, Responding with a trauma-informed approach, and Resisting re-traumatization.

SAMHSA highlights six key principles: safety; trustworthiness and transparency; peer support; collaboration and mutuality; empowerment, voice and choice, and; cultural, historical and gender issues. They also list 10 implementation domains: governance and leadership; policy; physical environment; engagement and involvement; cross sector collaboration; screening, assessment and treatment services; training and workforce development; progress monitoring and quality assurance; financing; and evaluation.

Researchers Kaitlin Casassa and colleagues interviewed sex trafficking survivors to search for how trauma bonds can be broken and healing can occur. The survivors identified three essential elements:

1. Education, or a framework, to understand trauma experience and trauma bonding.
2. Building a safe and trusted relationship, where brutal honesty can happen.
3. Cultivating self-love.

Researchers Wathen and colleagues describe four integrated principles evolved by key authors in this field.

1. Understand structural and interpersonal experiences of trauma and violence and their impacts on peoples' lives and behaviors.
2. Create emotionally, culturally, and physically safe spaces for service users and providers.
3. Foster opportunities for choice, collaboration, and connections.
4. Provide strengths-based and capacity building ways to support service users.

In contrast, Landini, a child and adolescent psychiatrist, describes five primary principles from DMM attachment theory for helping people better manage danger response.

1. Define problems in terms of response to danger.
2. The professional acts as a transitional attachment figure.
3. Explore the family's past and present responses to danger.
4. Work progressively and recursively with the family.
5. Practice reflective integration with the client as a form of teaching reflective integration.

Bowen and Murshid identified a framework of seven core TIC principles for social policy development.

1. Safety
2. Trustworthiness
3. Transparency
4. Collaboration
5. Empowerment
6. Choice
7. Intersectionality

Researchers Mitchell and colleagues searched for a consensus of TIC principles among early intervention specialists.

1. A trauma-informed early intervention psychosis service will work to protect the service user from ongoing abuse.
2. Staff within a trauma-informed early intervention psychosis service are trained to understand the link between trauma and psychosis and will be knowledgeable about trauma and its effects.
3. A trauma-informed early intervention psychosis service will:
  1. Seek agreement and consent from the service user before beginning any intervention;
  2. Build a trusting relationship with the service user;
  3. Provide appropriate training on trauma-informed care for all staff;
  4. Support staff in delivering safe assessment and treatments for the effects of trauma;
  5. Adopt a person-centred approach;
  6. Maintain a safe environment for service users;
  7. Have a calm, compassionate and supportive ethos;
  8. Be trustworthy;
  9. Acknowledge the relevance of psychological therapies;
  10. Be sensitive when discussing trauma;
  11. Be empathetic and non-judgmental;
  12. Provide supervision to staff;
  13. Provide regular supervision to practitioners who are working directly with trauma.

== General applications and techniques of TIC ==
SAMHSA's National Center for Trauma-Informed Care provides resources for developing a trauma-informed approach, including: (1) interventions; (2) national referral resources; and (3) information on how to shift from a paradigm that asks, "What's wrong with you?" to one that asks, "What has happened to you?"

=== Understand ===
Gaining knowledge about and understanding the effects of trauma may be the most complicated component of TIC, because it generally requires going beyond surface level explanations and using multiple explanatory theories and models or complex biopsychosocial models.

Trauma related behaviors, thoughts, feelings, and current experiences can seem confusing, perplexing, dysfunctional, or dangerous. These are usually adaptions to survive extreme contexts, methods to cope in the current moment, or efforts to communicate pain. Whatever the cause and adaptation, the professional's response can cause more harm, or some measure of emotional co-regulation, lessening of distress, and opportunity for healing.

=== Safety ===
The opposite of danger is safety, and most or all TIC models emphasize the provision of safety. In attachment theory the focus is on protection from danger. Van der Kolk describes how the "Brain and body are [neurobiologically] programmed to run for home, where safety can be restored and stress hormones can come to rest."

Cultural safety involves ensuring Indigenous people feel their cultural identity is accepted, free from judgement, and not threatened or compromised when accessing health and wellbeing support.

Safety can be enhanced by anticipating danger. Leary and colleagues describe how interpersonal rejection may be one of the most common precursors to aggression. While boundary-holding is a key aspect of TIC, avoiding a sudden and dramatic devaluation in an interpersonal relationship can reduce the subjective experience of rejection and reduce the risk violent aggression.

=== Relationship ===
Australian researchers found that the nature and quality of the relationship between two people talking about trauma can have a significant impact on the outcome of the discussion.

=== Communication ===
Traumatic experiences, including childhood attachment trauma, can impact memory function and communication style in children and adults.

Family law attorney Sarah Katz describes some experiences working with her legal clients and how she adjusts her relational and communication approach to meet their needs. Some clients need information delivered in short pieces with extra time to process, and some need to not have unannounced phone calls and be informed by email prior to verbal discussions. TIC helped her shift from thinking about how to develop a "litigation strategy" for clients, to thinking about developing a "representation strategy", which is a major shift in thinking for many lawyers.

Nurses can use enhanced communication skills, such as mindful presence, enhanced listening skills including the use of mirroring and rephrasing statements, allowing short periods of silence as a strategy to facilitate safety, and minimizing the use of "no" statements to facilitate patients sense of safety.

=== Resilience and strength building ===
Building psychological resilience and leveraging a person's existing strengths is a common element in most or all TIC models.

=== Integration of principles ===
Safety and relationship are intertwined. Roger's person-centered theory is founded on this basic principle. Attachment theory describes how a child's survival and well-being are dependent on a protective relationship with at least one primary caregiver. Badenoch's first principle of trauma-informed counseling is to use the practice of nonjudgmental and agendaless presence to create a foundation of safety and co-regulation. "Once the [client] sees (or feels) that the [professional] understands, then together they can begin the dangerous journey from where the [client] is, across the chasm, to safety."

=== Talking about trauma ===
Researchers and clinicians describe how to talk about trauma, particularly when people are reluctant to bring it up. Read and colleagues offer comprehensive details for mental health professionals navigating difficult discussions.

There are numerous barriers for professionals which can inhibit raising discussions about trauma with clients/patients. They include lack of time, being too risk-averse, lack of training and understanding of trauma, fear of discussing emotions and difficult situations, fear of upsetting clients, male or older clients, lack of opportunity to reflect on professional experiences, over-reliance on non trauma-informed care models (such as traditional psychology, and biomedical and biogenetic models of mental distress).

Sweeney and colleagues suggest trauma discussions may include the following techniques and principles.

1. Ask every client about trauma experience, especially in initial assessment of general psychosocial history.
2. To establish relational safety and trust, or rapport, approach people sensitively while attuning to their emotions, nonverbal expressions, what they are saying, and what they might be excluding from their narrative. Badenoch suggests a stance of "agendaless presence" helps professionals reduce judgmentalism.
3. Consider confidentiality needs. Some people may be hesitant to disclose some or all of their experience, and may wish to maintain control over to whom or in what context it is disclosed. Attorney-client privilege, so long as not waived and there is no mandatory reporting requirement, offers the strongest protection for chosen non-disclosure.
4. It may be difficult for clients to process trauma topics in the middle of crisis situations, although creating a measure of safety and trust within the relationship may help facilitate the discussion.
5. Clients may not be able or willing to admit traumatic experiences, but may display effects of traumatic experiences.
6. Prefacing trauma questions with brief normalizing statements, such as "That is a common reaction" might facilitate deeper discussions about trauma.
7. Asking for details about the experience may be traumatizing for the client. In situations where detail disclosure is necessary, such as law enforcement or litigation, certain approaches may be needed.
8. Specific questions rather than generalized questions may help if detail is needed, such as "Were you hit/pushed/spat on/held down?" as opposed to "Were you assaulted?" or "Was there domestic violence?"
9. Prior disclosures can be asked about, and if so, what the person's experience of that was.
10. Circumstances around intense emotions, such as shame and humiliation, may difficult to explore.
11. Discussions may be paced according to the person's needs and abilities.
12. Giving choices may provide agency, including whether to talk about it or not, and what to do about it.
13. Working collaboratively, in partnership with the person to explore appropriate solutions may be acceptable to the client.
14. Professionals might reflect on their own understanding of current research about safety and danger.
15. The offer of relatively comprehensive support for trauma and safety plan options may ease and promote discussions. Particularly if the discussion about trauma is extensive, a lack of follow up support options may lead to re-traumatization.
16. Concluding questions about how the client is feeling may be useful.
17. Follow-up appointments and questions about what the client plans to do next may be useful.

A literature review of women's and clinicians' views on trauma discussions during pregnancy found that both groups thought discussions were valuable and worthwhile, as long as there was both adequate time to have the conversation and support available for those who need it. Women wanted to know in advance that the issue would be raised and to speak with a clinician they knew and trusted.

== Specific applications and techniques of TIC ==
TIC principles are applied in child welfare services, child abuse, social work, psychology, medicine, oral health services, nursing, and correctional services. They have been applied in interpersonal abuse situations including domestic violence, elder abuse.

Wathen and Varcoe offer specific suggestions for specific disciplines, such as primary health care clinics, emergency rooms, and for contexts involving interpersonal, structural, or any form of violence. One simple suggestion, in order to enhance the perception of care, safety and agency in the first phone call, is to provide calm phrasing and tone, minimize hold times, and offer brief explanations for delays.

Trauma- and violence-informed practices can be or are addressed in mindfulness programs, yoga, education, obstetrics and gynaecology, cancer treatment, psychological trauma in older adults, military sexual trauma, cybersex trafficking, sex trafficking and trafficking of children, child advocacy, decarceration efforts, and peer support. HDR, Inc. incorporates trauma-informed design principles in prison architecture.

Many therapy models utilize TIC principles, including psychodynamic theory, attachment-informed therapy, trauma focused cognitive behavioral therapy, trauma-informed feminist therapy, trauma systems therapy which utilizes EMDR, trauma focused CBT, The Art of Yoga Project, the Wellness Recovery Action Plan, music therapy, internet-based treatments for trauma survivors, and in aging therapy.

Culturally-focused applications, often considering indigenous-specific traumas have been applied in minoritized communities, and Maori culture.

=== Domestic violence ===
Trauma- and violence-informed (TVIC) principles are widely used in domestic violence and intimate partner violence (IPV) situations. For working with survivors, TVIC has been combined with yoga, motivational interviewing, primary physician care in sexual assault cases, hospital-based violence intervention, improving access to employment, cases involving HIV and IPV, and cases involving PTSD and IPV.

In 2015 Wilson and colleagues reviewed literature describing trauma-informed practices (TIP) used in the DV context. They found principles organized around six clusters. Promoting safety, giving choice and control, and building healthy relationships are particularly important TVIC concepts in this field.

- Promote emotional safety: Consider design options of physical environment. Promote a staff-wide approach to nonjudgmental interactions with clients. Develop organizational policies and communicate them clearly.
- Restore choice and control: Give choice and control broadly (it was taken from them previously). Allow clients to tell their stories in their own way and speed. Actively solicit client input on which services they want to utilize.
- Facilitate healing connections: Professionals should develop enhanced listening and relationship skills, and use these to build a supporting and trusted relationship with the client. This is sometimes called a person-centered approach. Listening skills can involve active listening, expressing no judgment, listening with the intent hear rather than with the intent to respond, and agendaless presence. Clients can be helped to develop healthy relationships at every level, including parent-child, and between survivors and their communities.
- Support coping: Provide clients neurobiopsycho-education about the nature and effects of DV. Help clients gain an awareness of triggers, perhaps with a triggers checklist. Validate and help strengthen client coping, or self-protective strategies. Develop a company-wide holistic and multidimensional approach improving client well-being, which includes healthy eating and living, and managing stress hormone activation.
- Respond to identify and context: Be mindful and responsive to gender, race, sexual orientation, ability, culture, immigration status, language, and social and historical contexts. These considerations can be reflected in informational materials. Gain awareness of assumptions based on identity and context. Organizations should be designed to be able to represent the diversity of its clients.
- Build strengths: Professionals can develop skills to identify, affirmatively value, and focus on client strengths. Ask "What helped in the past?" Help develop client leadership skills.

Providing education or a framework for understanding is also an important element of healing.

=== Nursing ===
In nursing, trauma-informed care approaches are described for patients, who presumably are all experiencing some form of trauma in addition to prior medical and/or social traumas. Nurses are in a unique position to recognize and address the broad spectrum of traumas including toxic medical responses from cumulative and chronic trauma.

TIC approaches can include awareness and detection of trauma expressions. Nurses can use enhanced communication, as noted above.

Goddard, et al, offered specific responses to specific issues such as suggesting a soothing bedtime routine for difficulty falling asleep. They provide a list of what trauma might look like at various developmental stages, such as false bravado in school-aged children and withdrawing from activities in adolescence. They identified a number of screening tools for various healthcare settings, such as the Adverse Childhood Experiences Questionnaire (ACE-Q),

Pediatric ACEs Screening and Related Life-events Screener (PEARLS), the Pediatric Symptom Checklist (PSC), and the Child Trauma Screen (CTS). The authors emphasize the need to avoid re-traumatizing patients.

TIC is also described for nursing students' learning environment.

=== Hospice care ===
In hospice situations, Feldman describes a multi-stage TIC process. In stage one practitioners alleviate distress by taking actions on behalf of clients. This is unlike many social work approaches which first work to empower clients to solve their own problems. Many hospice patients have little time or energy to take actions on their own. In stage two, the patient is offered tools, psychoeducation and support to cope with distress and trauma impacts. Stage three involves full-threshold PTSD treatment. The last stage is less common based on limited prognosis.

=== Addressing social determinants of health as trauma-informed care ===
Many policies and programs have emerged from the field of trauma-informed care, with the intention of preventing trauma at the source by improving social determinants of health. For example, the Nurse Family Partnership is a childhood home visitation program with the goal of helping new mothers learn about parenting to reduce child abuse and improve the living environment of children. The program's approach resulted in fewer Adverse Childhood Experiences, better pregnancy outcomes, and improved cognitive development of children.

Other examples are federal benefit programs aimed at reducing poverty, increasing education, and improving employment, such as Earned Income Tax Credits and Child Tax Credits. These programs have evidence of reducing the risk of interpersonal violence and other forms of trauma. Communities that face a large burden of violence also have taken grassroots initiatives based on the approach of preventing trauma. The organization 365 Baltimore rebranded its violence prevention movement to one of peace creation in order to give power to community members, encourage institutions to take peace-making action, improve social determinants of health, and resist narratives that defined community members inherently violent.

=== Ethical guidelines ===
Ethical guidelines and principles imply and support TIC-specific frameworks.

Rudolph describes how to conceptualize and apply TIC in health care settings using egalitarian, relational, narrative and prinicplist ethical frameworks. (The clinical case vignette in Rudolph's article is informative.)

- Egalitarian-based ethics provide a foundation to think about how socioeconomic factors influence power and privilege to create and perpetuate loss of agency, oppression and trauma. Those factors include gender, race, education, income, and culture. One ethical approach is to provide people, especially those silenced and marginalized, the opportunity to have meaningful voice and choice.
- Care ethics and its relational approach promotes awareness for the need and value of compassion and empathy, integrating both patient and provider perspectives, and promoting patient safety, agency, and therapeutic alliance. The relational approach also orients clinical treatment to consider subjective and objective decision making factors rather than merely abstract or academic norms.
- Narrative ethics encourage providers to consider patient history and experience in a broader context such as a biopsychosocial approach to healing. A deliberate and explicit narrative approach promotes both fuller patient disclosure and provider empathy and efforts to reach a collaborative care alliance. This can lead to enhanced patient-centered moral judgments and care outcomes.
- Principlist ethics offers four equal moral principles to balance in individual cases. These are the right of patients to make decisions (autonomy), promotion of patient welfare (beneficence), avoidance of patient harm (nonmaleficence), and justice through the fair allocation of scarce resources. These principles align with and support TIC frameworks and goals.

Vadervort and colleagues describe how child welfare workers can experience trauma participating in legal proceedings and how understanding professional ethics can reduce their trauma experiences.

== Organizational applications and techniques of TIC ==
TIC principles have been applied in organizations, including behavioral health services, and policy analysis.

The Connecticut Department of Children and Families (DCF) implemented wide-ranging TIC policies, which were analyzed over a five year period by Connell and colleagues in a research study. TIC components included 1) workforce development, 2) trauma screening, 3) supports for secondary traumatic stress, 4) dissemination of trauma-focused evidence-based treatments (EBTs), and 5) development of trauma-informed policy and practice guides. The study found significant and enduring improvements in DCF's capacity to provide trauma-informed care. DCF employees became more aware of TIC services and policies, although there was less improvement in awareness of efforts to implement new practices. The Child Welfare Trauma Toolkit Training program was one program implemented.

The Care Quality Commission in England has developed training for its care inspection staff to ensure that they understand trauma-informed approaches practices within the service settings they inspect.

=== Hospital-based intervention programs ===
Trauma-informed care can play a large role in both the treatment of trauma and prevention of violence. Survivors of violence have a re-injury rate ranging from 16% to 44%. Proponents argue that TIC is necessary to interrupt this broader cycle of violence, as studies show that medical treatment alone does not protect survivors from re-injury.

Hospital-based intervention programs (HVIPs) have gained popularity for intervening in the cycle of violence. HVIPs aim to intervene when a survivor comes in contact with the medical system. Many of these programs use peer-based case management as a form of trauma-informed care, in order to match survivors with resources in a culturally competent, trauma-informed way. Studies show that having managers with lived-experience can validate the experiences of clients and erode cultural stigmas that may come with seeking help in traditional case-working frameworks.

More specifically, Jang et al. note that case managers being from the same community as clients created a sense of personal understanding and connection that was extremely important for the client's participation in the program. The same study suggests that the most successfully met client-reported needs by HVIPs included mental health, legal services, and financial/victim-of-crime assistance. For mental health in particular, the study noted that clients who had their mental health needs met were 6 times more likely to engage and complete their programs. Another study found that survivors that engaged in HVIP services were more likely to continue with medical follow-up visits, and return to work or school after their injury compared to those who did not have access to these programs.

Following positive results, some medical professionals have called for the implementation of HVIPs at all Level 1 trauma centers to deliver trauma-informed care addressing social determinants of health post-injury. Notably, HVIPs as a trauma-informed care model struggled with meeting long term needs of clients, such as employment, education, and housing.

== Governments, organizations and people promoting TIC ==
Organizations which have or support TIC programs in the U.S. include the Substance Abuse and Mental Health Services Administration (SAMHSA), National Center for Trauma-informed care, the National Child Traumatic Stress Network, the Surgeon General of California, National Center for Victims of Crime, The Exodus Road, Stetson School, and the American Institutes for Research. Organizations outside the U.S. include, the Italian National Trauma Center, in France the Osiris Care Center,

Many countries and states promote trauma-informed care. States and state agencies in the U.S. include the Arizona Govenor's Office of Youth, Faith and Family, Florida Department of Juvenile Justice, Missouri Department of Health, with The Missouri Model, Oregon, Texas Supreme Court, Washington State. Outside the U.S., TIC is supported in New South Wales Australia, United Kingdom, Universities supporting trauma-informed care include University of South Alabama, Case Western Reserve Univsertiy, University of Montana, University at Buffalo, New York, University of South Carolina, Southern New Hampshire University, William & Mary School of Education, and Yale Medical School.

Psychologist Diana Fosha promotes the use of therapeutic models and approaches which integrate relevant neurobiological processes, including implicit memory, and cognitive, emotional and sensorimotor processing. Ricky Greenwald applies eye movement desensitization and reprocessing (EMDR) and founded the Trauma Institute & Child Trauma Institute. Lady Edwina Grosvenor promotes a trauma informed approach in women's prisons in the United Kingdom. Joy Hofmeister promotes trauma-informed instruction for educators in Oklahoma. Anna Baranowsky developed the Traumatology Institute and addresses secondary trauma and effective PTSD techniques.

Other notable people who have developed or promoted TIC programs include Tania Glyde, Carol Wick, Pat Frankish, Michael Huggins, Brad Lamm, Barbara Voss, Cathy Malchiodi. Activists, journalists and artists supporting TIC awareness include Liz Mullinar, Omar Bah, Ruthie Bolton, Caoimhe Butterly, and Gang Badoy.

== Effectiveness ==
Some efforts have been made to measure the effectiveness of TIC implementations.

Wathen and colleagues conducted a scoping review in 2020 and concluded that of the 13 measures they examined which assess TIC effectiveness, none fully assessed the effectiveness of interventions to implement TVIC (and TIC). The measures they examined mostly assessed for TVIC principles of understanding and safety, and fewer looked at collaboration, choice, strength-based and capacity-building. They found several challenges to assessing the effectiveness of TVIC implementations, or existence of vicarious trauma. There was an apparent lack of clarity on how TVIC theory related to the measure's development and validation approaches so it was not always clear precisely what was being investigated. Another is the broad range of topics within the TVIC framework. They found no assessment measured for implicit bias in professionals. They found conflation of "trauma focused", such as may be used in primary health care, policing and education, with "trauma informed" where trauma specific services are routinely provided.

== See also ==
- Community accountability
- Victims' rights
