= White Lotus Foundation =

Yoga training organization

The White Lotus Foundation has trained and certified hundreds of instructors of Yoga until 2018. White Lotus was founded in 1968 and is led by Ganga White and Tracey Rich, both practitioners of Hatha-Flow Yoga, and the Yoga of Inquiry.

== Organization, Public Service ==
The Board of Trustees and Advisory Board feature many individuals prominent in their fields, including professor David G. White, Ph.D., doctor Hyla Cass, MD, and the musician/songwriter Sting. Sting wrote a foreword to White's book, Yoga Beyond Belief, in 2007. Yoga Beyond Belief has become a standard text for Yoga courses and Yoga teacher trainings around the world.

The Foundation holds two-week teacher training sessions each year with up to thirty attendees each, as well as retreats for yoga therapy, Thai yoga therapy, meditation and advanced training lasting from three to seven days. White and wife Tracey Rich have produced numerous best-selling videos, including Total Yoga, one of the top selling Yoga videos in the United States with total sales of more than 1.8 million copies.

Its mountain retreat headquarters and instruction center is located a few miles outside Santa Barbara, California within the Los Padres National Forest. The campus overlooks Santa Barbara, the Pacific Ocean and Channel Islands of California. The foundation was housed in various locations in Los Angeles for about fifteen years, and then moved to its present site in 1983.

The Foundation has made its facilities available to public service groups, for example teens-at-risk programs in cooperation with The Art of Yoga Project and self-esteem programs through the Academy of Healing Arts. It has donated books to libraries and correctional facilities. It has offered teacher training scholarships for teachers committed to giving free service by way of yoga to women’s shelters and homes for abused women. White Lotus has been active in environmental rainforest preservation work.

== Ongoing Impact ==
The Foundation has been in operation for more than fifty years. Many of its graduates have established the next generation of yoga schools.

The Foundation has been recognized as establishing Santa Barbara as a major center for the practice and training of Yoga. For example, the Santa Barbara Independent called the city "A Mecca for Training Programs and Practice" and wrote that White Lotus "serves as the origin story for many instructors around the world."
