= Trauma-informed approaches in education =

Pedagogical theory and practice

Trauma-informed approaches in education (TIE) are educational techniques that acknowledge the prevalence of adverse childhood experiences and other traumas on students and attempt to mitigate the widespread impact of such trauma. By adopting trauma-informed principles, educational organizations aim to create a supportive environment that facilitates learning and promotes the emotional well-being of students. Trauma-informed education is referred to with varying terminology (e.g., trauma-informed school, trauma-sensitive school, trauma-responsive school).

As articulated by the National Child Traumatic Stress Network (NCTSN), trauma-informed approaches in education aim to engage school personnel and community members in interventions that aim to identify and respond to the potential negative effects of traumatic stress within the school system. This is typically achieved through the integration of trauma-related skills and knowledge into school culture, practices, and policies. Adoption of TIE consists of implementing organizational changes, workforce development, and practice changes that reflect the four key expectations of a trauma-informed approach (i.e., realizing the impact of, recognizing signs of and responding to trauma, as well as resisting re-traumatization). The goals of TIE are to improve student, teacher, and school-level outcomes including academic performance, psychological and socio-emotional well-being, school climate, and teacher-student relationships.

A key component of TIE strategies is the incorporation of trauma-informed writing techniques, as examined by Molly Moran. Students are given a safe space to process and communicate their trauma through structured writing exercises, which helps them develop coping skills, emotional stability, and self-awareness. Students' academic performance is enhanced by this writing and healing strategy, which also helps them develop their critical thinking, communication, and sense of agency over their narratives.

== Impact of trauma ==
The roots of trauma-informed schools can be traced back to the broader acknowledgment of the role of trauma in shaping students' behaviors and academic performances. The extensive exposure of children and adolescents to traumatic events stands as a considerable public health challenge. National studies of youth mental health reveal that at least two-thirds of youth have encountered at least one traumatic event in their lifetime. Encouraging students who have experienced trauma to succeed academically and emotionally can be achieved by incorporating trauma-informed writing practices into educational environments. Students can express and process their trauma via writing, which can help them become more emotionally stable, more self-aware, and develop better Coping mechanisms. Writing assignments can also assist students in strengthening their communication skills, critical thinking abilities, and sense of agency over their identities and narratives. Trauma-informed writing assignments give students a healing way to address and work through their traumatic experiences. They also help students become emotionally stable and resilient as they bravely express their deepest feelings and thoughts. Students obtain a deeper understanding of who they are and how to manage their trauma while also learning adaptive coping strategies through this process. Additionally, writing improves kids' communication abilities by giving them the opportunity to clearly explain their ideas and stand up for themselves. Plus, trauma-informed writing assignments foster critical thinking skills as students work through challenging themes and subjects, enabling them to thoroughly and perceptively assess, analyze, and synthesize their experiences.

Early experiences with trauma are correlated with later onset of mental and physical health concerns. The impact of trauma within educational contexts necessitates a careful consideration of the ethical dimensions surrounding students' personal writing. Teachers place a high priority on concepts like informed consent, confidentiality, and cultural sensitivity when students choose to write about their traumatic experiences. Creating a respectful and encouraging learning environment requires striking a balance between the need to protect students' privacy and personal boundaries and an understanding of the underlying power dynamics between educators and learners. In addition to being prepared to provide the necessary tools and support to students who may encounter triggers or distress, educators should work to create a secure and encouraging environment in which students feel empowered to share their stories. These cognitive consequences significantly impact academic achievement, likely contributing to poorer reading performance, poorer test results, and lower grades. Given the high prevalence of trauma exposure among youth and the risks identified, there has been a longstanding call for youth serving sectors to prioritize and address the needs of students affected by trauma.

== Advent of trauma-informed care ==
Advocacy for trauma-informed systems change began in the early 2000s with an argument by Harris and Fallot. Their argument was that the impacts of trauma are pervasive, and not limited to the traumatic experience itself. They claim that trauma does not only impact the individual's functioning in relation to trauma-specific stimuli, but also impacts other sequelae (e.g., physical health, social, academic, and interpersonal problems), and importantly their ability to interface with help seeking systems; thus changes should be made to these systems to better accommodate and serve the needs of trauma-impacted individuals. Edwell, Singer, and Jack's investigation of rhetorical technique as a medical intervention provides insight into the significance of narrative medicine in fostering empathy and promoting healing in healthcare environments by highlighting the influence of individual narratives on the development of patient-provider interactions. There is a big emphasis on the potential of language and communication as therapeutic tools by supporting interdisciplinary approaches that include rhetorical strategies, especially when discussing difficult themes like trauma. They underline the importance of integrating expressive practices into patient treatment and the empowering character of expressive activities in helping people process and cope with trauma In their model for trauma-informed care, Harris and Fallot conceptualize organizational change for health service systems, incorporating an understanding of trauma and the conditions that enhance or interfere with healing, as an imperative response to supporting individuals with traumatic experiences and resisting their re-traumatization. Harris and Fallot's model assumes a more holistic stance in regards to responding to trauma, compared to traditional, trauma-specific, clinical models which prioritize individual, and trauma-specific interventions that directly target trauma symptoms.

Since Harris and Fallot's model, multiple models for trauma-informed care have emerged. Across all models, the goal of a trauma-informed approach remains to create an environment that prioritizes safety, choice, control, and empowerment for the impacted individual. This is reflected in the widely accepted core principles of trauma-informed care, published by the Substance Abuse and Mental Health Services Administration (SAMHSA). These principles include: ensuring safety, trustworthiness and transparency, peer support, collaboration & mutuality, empowerment & choice, and attention to cultural, historical, and gender issues. See Trauma-informed care for further information. These principles are typically upheld by general approaches that prompt increased sensitivity towards the impact of trauma and trauma-specific services (e.g., assessment, psychoeducation, treatment) that can address symptoms and trauma recovery.

A trauma-informed approach recognizes schools as a youth serving system consisting of practices, policies, and procedures with the potential for healing or re-traumatization of trauma-impacted youth. Trauma-informed approaches are appropriate for all levels of education including higher, secondary, and elementary education. Within a school system, a trauma-informed approach facilitates systemic change through the integration of a trauma lens into the operating procedures, policies, and development of the school workforce. Similar to the goals of trauma-informed care, the aim of a trauma-informed education approach is to create a safe, and welcoming environment that is attuned and responsive to the needs of not only students but all members of the school community (e.g. teachers, administrative staff, families) touched by the effects of trauma. All stakeholders are engaged in supporting the recovery and overall wellbeing of students through approaches that develop a school-wide awareness of trauma and the capacity to respond to student needs with trauma-informed skills.

== Organizational change ==
Trauma-informed organizational changes refer to the active inclusion of knowledge about trauma and its impacts into the development of school policies and procedures. This includes revising or developing new policies and procedures related to areas such as school safety, student discipline; as well as the use of implementation strategies to facilitate the adoption and maintenance of trauma informed changes. An essential underpinning of trauma informed care and approach is the awareness that school procedures and the enforcement of school policies can be re-traumatizing if not approached sensitively. Ubiquitous across trauma-informed education best-practice guidelines, and real-world implementation of trauma-informed education have been calls to reform policies for school disciplinary practice.

School disciplinary policies have often implemented zero-tolerance exclusionary practices as a response to student behavior. These policies and protocols can be re-traumatizing for youth who have already experienced some form of victimization. Moreover, racially and ethnically minoritized students disproportionately receive exclusionary discipline responses and consequently are disproportionately subject to such re-traumatization. Students who have experienced trauma may be particularly likely to experience dysregulated emotions and behavior in school settings, including poor concentration and difficulty staying on task, disruptive behavior and verbal and physical aggression towards peers or staff.

Trauma-informed approaches to school discipline first recognize student behavior as a potential response to, or symptom of trauma and resist attribution of student behavior to willful defiance or aggression. Trauma-informed discipline responds to student behavior using techniques that reinforce trauma-informed principles of safety, trust, and collaboration. Rather than emphasizing punitive, exclusionary discipline practice, a trauma-informed school prioritizes the use of therapeutic or behavioral techniques that promote positive behavior supports for students, prevent behavior problems, and support student self-regulatory capabilities. Disciplinary practice changes have included the use of behavior de-escalation strategies, restorative justice practices, social emotional learning interventions as first-line responses to student behavior in place of or prior to escalation to exclusionary practices. To date, no research has explored the direct or indirect effects of disciplinary reform within trauma-informed schools on student's social, emotional, or academic outcomes. However, research has identified the effects of trauma informed school disciplinary reform on school-level outcomes, such as: reductions in office referrals for behavior, reductions in in-school suspension, and reductions in out-of-school suspensions.

== Workforce professional development change ==
Professional development training is a strategy adopted by schools wherein a structured training opportunity is used to introduce the rationale, disseminate essential knowledge, and teach relevant skills for a new school-wide initiative. In addition to providing school personnel with the necessary knowledge and skills to implement a new initiative, the goal of this training is also to build commitment and support for the new initiative amongst school personnel.

The goal of professional development training for trauma-informed approaches in schools is to 1. build support for the adoption of a school-based trauma-informed approach, and 2. to equip school personnel with knowledge about the impacts of trauma and the competencies necessary to recognize and respond to students' signs of trauma. Current models of trauma-informed school professional development augment school personnel knowledge on multiple factors: the prevalence and different types of traumatic experiences that youth report, the effects of trauma on students' cognitive and emotional functioning, and the impact of secondary traumatic stress on service providers. In addition to introducing new knowledge, professional development opportunities teach school personnel how to implement trauma-sensitive strategies to respond to youth behavior, and trauma-related needs. This may involve skills and strategies to regulate or de-escalate youth emotion, build trusting relationships, create safe and predictable classroom environments; as well as evidence-based interventions for trauma (such as Cognitive behavioral therapy, TF-CBT, and CBITS). Additionally, best-practice guidelines for trauma-informed school professional development suggest that schools include cultural responsiveness training for school personnel in order to better understand student's unique cultural perspectives and counteract the potential for implicit and explicit bias on an institutional level and in individual interactions. Though not discussed explicitly in reviews of trauma-informed school professional development, some published descriptions of trauma-informed schools have described their efforts to include components related to cultural responsiveness in their professional development opportunities.

There is considerable variation across approaches to trauma-informed school professional development. No standardized version of trauma-informed professional development for school settings exist. There has been no empirical research evaluating what knowledge content, training duration/intensity, or types of school personnel (e.g., teachers, support staff, security personnel, principal, school administrators) are needed in trauma-informed school professional development to facilitate desired change in school practices and consequently student outcomes. There is mixed evidence about the impact of trauma-informed professional development on student, teacher, and school level outcomes. One review of general trauma-informed professional development found that across studies, staff knowledge and attitudes related to trauma-informed practice improved after training. However, a review of school-based trauma-informed approaches identified variable outcomes – with some studies demonstrating no improvements in teacher knowledge and attitudes about trauma-informed practice.

== Educational and clinical practice change ==
Educational or Clinical Practices concern the provision of student-facing trauma-informed clinical interventions and educational practices. This can include trauma-informed teaching pedagogy or curriculum design; or trauma-specific clinical services such as trauma screening, mental health referrals, and multi-tiered intervention practices. Trauma-informed teaching pedagogies acknowledge the cognitive, and learning consequences of trauma exposure, not limited to difficulties with attention, information processing, memory, and behavior dysregulation. Thus a trauma-informed approach to teaching adopts learning practices and classroom design that align with trauma-informed core areas (e.g., ensuring safety, trustworthiness & transparency, peer support, collaboration & mutuality, empowerment & choice, and attention to cultural, historical, & gender issues). A review of existing trauma-informed teaching pedagogies have two primary focal points: repairing dysregulated responses to traumatic stress, and fostering strong student-teacher relationships to support healthy student attachment styles. Examples of practices used to support students in developing appropriate responses to stress, and building healthy attachment capacities include: establishment of clear and consistent classroom expectations, self-regulation strategies (e.g., mindfulness techniques), classroom regulation strategies (e.g., "brain breaks"), academic accommodations (e.g., extended assignment time or individualized academic supports), and encouraging student input for class structure, assignments, and course syllabus. By integrating trauma-sensitive strategies, teachers can create an inclusive learning environment that supports the emotional and academic growth of all students.

=== Multi-tiered intervention systems ===
Multi-tiered intervention systems support schools in providing clinical services to students impacted by trauma with varying levels of need (Tier 1, Tier 2, and Tier 3). They are used in most trauma-informed educational approaches.

Tier 1 Practices refer to whole school or classroom interventions that strengthen students emotional and social skills and aim to prevent development of clinically severe trauma. Common Tier 1 practices are trauma psychoeducation, social emotional learning interventions (i.e., emotion regulation techniques, healthy coping mechanisms, social skills development), and Positive Behavior Implementation and Support interventions.

Tier 2 Practices are interventions or supports for students with demonstrated deficits in social/emotional/behavioral risk characteristics (e.g., elevated emotion dysregulation, attentional challenges, hyperactivity behaviors). These typically include aggression prevention interventions, relaxation interventions, play therapy, and intensive skill building (e.g. social skills, emotion regulation skills, and cognitive processing skills).

Tier 3 Practices refer to clinical treatments or interventions for students with indicated trauma problems or diagnosed mental health needs. These supports include individual psychotherapy with school-based clinicians, and trauma focused evidence-based therapies (e.g. Trauma-Focused Cognitive Behavioral Therapy, Cognitive Behavioral Intervention for Trauma in Schools).

== See also ==
- Trauma-informed care
- Mental health in education
- PTSD in children and adolescents
