= Pat Frankish =

- Born: United Kingdom
- Occupation: Psychologist

Pat Frankish is a British consultant psychologist and psychotherapist with over 35 years’ experience working with children and adults with complex needs.

Frankish has pioneered the development of psychotherapy for people with intellectual disabilities, demonstrating its effectiveness for people with the most complex needs, including those in high secure settings.

As a result of her childhood experiences living in the grounds of a long-stay hospital for those with mental handicap as it was then called, Dr Frankish has dedicated her career to improving the lives of this client group.

Through continuing her clinical work with both disabled and non-disabled clients, Dr Frankish is able to put theory into practice. Alongside this, Dr Frankish has directly implemented her model of trauma-informed care by establishing a social care organisation together with her daughter. Amara Care provides support to more than 30 clients.

Past President of the British Psychological Society., Frankish has presented at conferences across the world. She has authored and edited several books, which are available from Pavilion and Karnac.
