= Tania Glyde =

English psychotherapist and writer

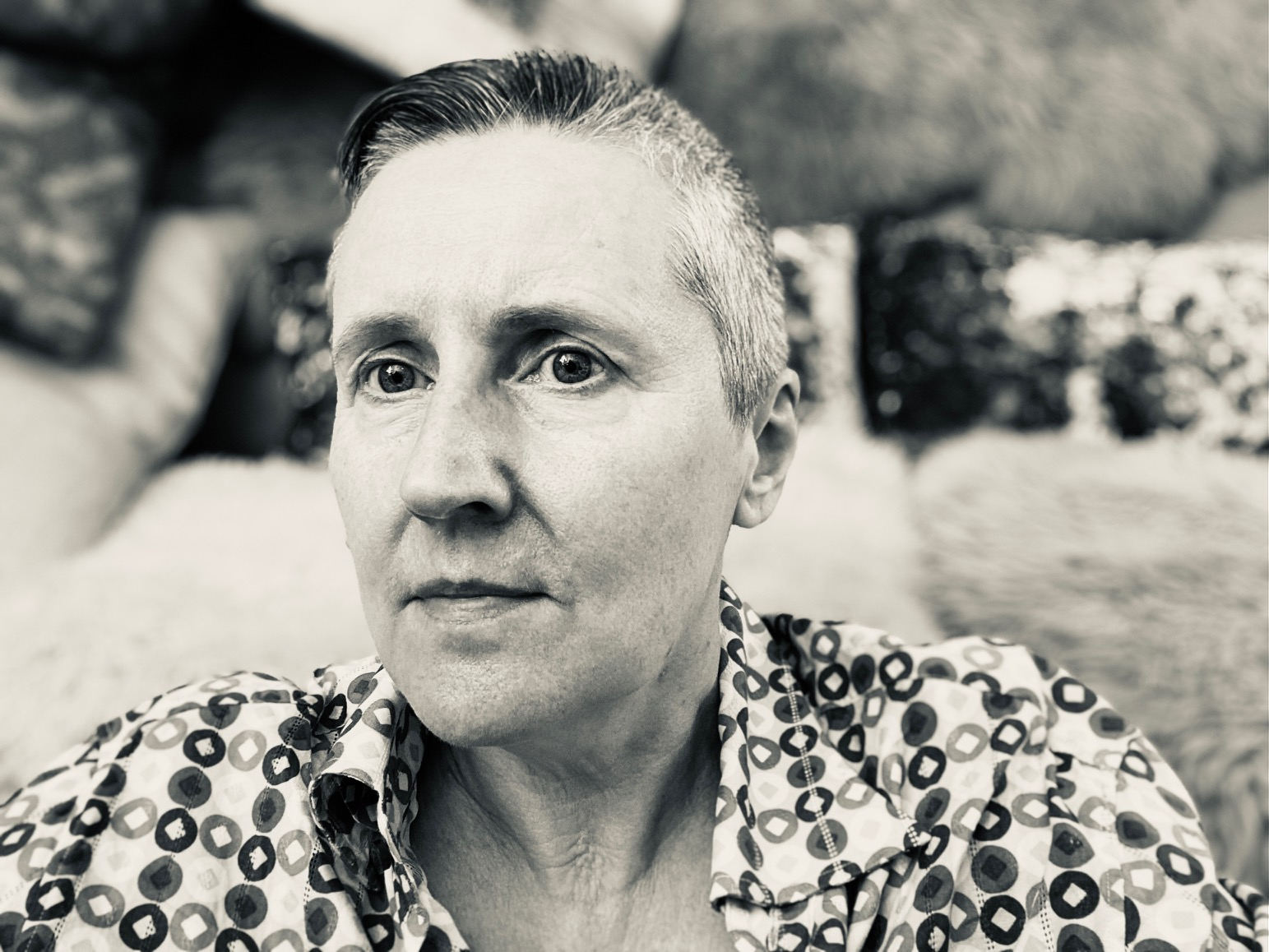
- Occupations: Psychotherapist and writer
- Known for: Psychotherapy and Counselor

Tania Glyde is a British psychotherapist and writer. They trained in integrative psychotherapy at the Minster Centre, London, qualifying in 2013. Their work is trauma-informed and pluralistic, and they work mainly with Gender, Sex and Relationship Diverse (GSRD; previously known as GSD) clients.

For a Masters in Psychotherapy and Counselling from the University of East London (2019) Glyde researched the experiences of LGBTQ+ and menopausal people, both in therapy and in the wider healthcare system in the UK. The resulting work, 'How can therapists best support their queer menopausal clients?’ is published in the Taylor & Francis journal Sexual & Relationship Therapy.

They continue to promote awareness around LGBTQ+ approaches to menopause through social media, writing, and activism.

In 2021 they gave written evidence to UK Parliament about the experiences of LGBTQ people in the workplace. [Ref MEW0087]

LGBTQIA+ Menopause: Room for Improvement was published in the Lancet ‘Art of Medicine’ section in October 2022.

They have a chapter on queer menopause in the Pink Therapy textbook Erotically Queer (2023). ‘Queer Menopause - working with the LGBTQIA+ menopausal client'

They founded, with several colleagues, the London Gender, Sex and Relationship Diversity Practice in 2014, which consists of a group of therapists focusing on GSRD sex & relationships.

They have a strong interest in sexology and trained as a somatic sex educator. They were Time Out magazine's sex columnist from 2002 to 2004.

Their journalism has been published in the Lancet and Lancet Psychiatry, notably 'Wanting to be normal', 'BDSM – Psychotherapy's grey area', and Chemsex Exposed'.

They attended Oakham School in Rutland, before studying at Magdalen College, Oxford where they read English Literature, and the University of East London for their Masters in Psychotherapy and Counselling.

== Bibliography ==
- Cleaning Up – How I Gave Up Drinking and Lived (2008) ISBN 1-852429-49-6
- Junk DNA (2000) ISBN 1-899598-19-7
- Clever Girl (1995) ISBN 0-330342-59-2
