= Trauma-informed feminist therapy =

Therapy model

In psychology, trauma-informed feminist therapy is a model of trauma for men, women and all genders that incorporates the client's sociopolitical context.

In feminist therapy, the therapist views the client's trauma experience through a sociopolitical lens. In other words, the therapist must consider how the client's social and political environment could have contributed to their trauma or perpetuated it. Feminist theory argues that certain traumas are produced and maintained by institutionalized discrimination and social hierarchies.

== Background ==
The diagnosis of post-traumatic stress disorder, or PTSD, was first recognized in 1980 and published in the third edition of the Diagnostic and Statistical Manual of Mental Disorders. The original PTSD diagnosis was formulated to fit the symptomology of veterans returning home from combat.

Feminist psychologists modified the diagnosis when treating patients with exposure to childhood sexual assault, chronic abuse, and gender-based trauma. Trauma-informed feminist therapy challenged both the traditional conceptualization of the PTSD diagnosis, as well as the overall standard approach to trauma treatment, by proposing new models of trauma that incorporate sociopolitical context.

Feminist therapy began in the 1960s during the second wave of feminism. According to its proponents, a sexist power structure in American psychotherapy was harmful to women suffering trauma. Initially, groups of women began to meet at leader-less "consciousness-raising" meetings where women shared their experiences with sexism in therapy. Many women evoked opinions that oppressive cultural norms affect mental health. To them, the groups acted as a way to both draw attention to the oppression within the mental health system, as well as a way to empower women.

The original consciousness-raising meetings evolved into an integrated set of principles to be applied in therapy. Today, feminist therapy has expanded to reflect the ideas of the third wave of feminism, that the patriarchy is harmful to both men and women. Another part of feminist therapy is a focus on social justice issues for people, regardless of their gender, culture, sexuality, social class, phenotype, or national origin.

== Feminist models of trauma ==
Feminist theory argues that certain traumas are produced and maintained by institutionalized discrimination and social hierarchies Root (1992) coined the term "insidious traumatization" to describe the distress that builds when one is the member of a marginalized group and subjected to constant threat of discrimination. Exposure to insidious trauma is thought to creates both unique vulnerabilities and unique strengths. Feminist theory argues that insidious traumatization can lead to full blown PTSD symptoms.

Freyd (1996) expanded the idea of insidious traumatization to include the term "betrayal trauma" to describe the specific kind of trauma that occurs when a child is abused by their caregivers; feminist theory argues that betrayal trauma is inherently different from single-incident trauma, mainly because betrayal trauma tends to manifest specifically as interpersonal difficulties and dissociative symptoms, while traditional intrusive symptoms are usually not present.

== Trauma diagnosis within feminist therapy framework ==
Overall, feminist theory argues against the use of diagnoses, except in instances where a diagnosis would assist the service user in gaining access to mental health care. Feminist therapy aims to move away from pathologizing responses to trauma in favor of framing responses as "survival techniques".

For example, in regard to diagnoses that relate to trauma, feminist theory takes issue with the diagnosis borderline personality disorder (BPD), a disorder that is often linked to severe childhood trauma. Feminist theory posits that a diagnosis of BPD unnecessarily pathologizes normative and adaptive responses to betrayal trauma.

In addition, feminist theory argues that chronic exposure to inescapable trauma, such as childhood abuse, is better captured by the diagnosis of complex post-traumatic stress disorder (CPTSD); CPTSD has been proposed as an alternative diagnosis for those responding to sever trauma with BPD-like symptoms, in an attempt to view symptoms as a survival response as opposed to a personality disorder.

== Trauma treatment with feminist therapy framework ==
Trauma-informed feminist therapy encourages therapists to take an eclectic approach to trauma treatment, allowing the service user to be the expert of their own experience. Feminist therapy seeks to break down what it terms the inherent power differential between clinician and client, by actively constructing an egalitarian relationship.

In addition, feminist therapists strive to understand their client's experience with trauma by acknowledging and exploring how social structure influenced the trauma. Trauma-informed feminist therapy argues that successful treatment is not about creating an absence of symptoms; instead feminist therapy aims to assist trauma survivors in creating a non-blaming view of their traumatic experience from which they can gain a sense of empowerment.
