= Carol Wick =

Activist

Carol Wick is an activist and advisor on ending violence against women to politicians, business leaders, non-profits, and philanthropists. She serves on the UN Women Ending Violence Against Women roster.

== Education ==
Wick is a licensed trauma therapist, and Florida approved supervisor. She obtained a Bachelor of Science in Psychology from Florida State in (1988) and MS from Auburn University in (1990).

Wick is a graduate of the Advanced Entrepreneurship program at the Crummer School of Business at Rollins College. She was inducted into the National Entrepreneurship Honor Society in (2019). She also holds a Certificate in Board Governance from the Harvard Kennedy School of Business.

== Career ==
Wick founded and runs Sharity Global, an international consulting firm that supports non-profits world over. She has served as a therapist for abused children. She developed an evidence-based community response to intimate partner violence and created the R3App, which is “the first app to have information that will aid medical professionals in hospitals, doctors’ offices and clinics make appropriate assessments of domestic violence victims and refer them to resources that can help.”

Wick's work engagement with Project Courage, which amplified on outreach and education on responding to domestic violence led to a significant decrease in homicides related to domestic violence and millions of dollars in tax savings in Central Florida. Project Courage became an evidenced based method of addressing local domestic violence by engaging the community.

Wick facilitated the construction of one of the first onsite standalone kennels at a shelter for domestic violence in the US and a trauma-informed, survivor designed shelter for families. She now serves on the board of the international non-profit Saf-T that focuses on building pet friendly solutions at shelters globally.

Wick has a history of successfully passing legislation including two bills to protect survivors' information and criminalisation of abusers contacting victims from jail. In 2019, she started a group on Facebook for survivors and allies to assist in the passage of legislation in Florida, called “Survivors for System Change” in Florida. With this group Wick led the fight to pass Florida HB199, also known as Donna's Law. This legislation eliminated the statute of limitations for sex crimes against children.

Wick also led the movement to pass HB673, known as Gail's Law, which created the first Rape Kit tracking system, in partnership with RAINN and the Joyful Heart Foundation.

Wick spearheaded the public uncovering of the misappropriation of nearly $8M in funds by the Florida Coalition Against Domestic Violence. She was the only person asked to give public testimony by the Florida House Public Integrity and Ethics committee in 2019.

In 2020, Wick partnered with Children's Home Society to develop a pilot program to reduce children removed from homes for domestic violence. The successful pilot has been funded to be developed as a national best practice and has been presented at several national and international conferences.

Following concerns around the impact of the COVID-19 pandemic in 2020, Wick funded an international study of 250 domestic violence shelters in North America and the Caribbean and their fundraising effectiveness. The results were used to develop the Violence Against Women and Children Center for Capacity Building.

She served as the chief executive officer at Harbor House of Central Florida from 2006 to 2016, before which she was the executive director at the PACE Center for Girls, Inc. from 1994 to 2006.

== Research & writing ==
Wick has authored and co-authored several research publications centred on intimate partner violence, children's home safety, fundraising for domestic violence organizations, the role of physicians in preventing and addressing intimate partner violence, empowering employers and employees to recognize, respond to, and refer for intimate partner abuse and recommendations on housing for survivors of domestic violence.

== Awards ==
Wick was one of Orlando Business Journal's classes of CEOs of the Year honorees in 2014 and 2015. She was one of Orlando's 2014 Women Who Mean Business honorees. She was also the Juneteenth Hometown Hero and three-time runner up for Central Floridian of the Year. Her other awards include:

- 20 People Making a Difference in 2020, Orlando Magazine, October 2020.
- R3App Global Award Winner - Ending Violence @ Home Global App Challenge co-sponsored by the Institute of Medicine – 3rd Place
- 50 Most Powerful People, Orlando Magazine 2013 (OTW), 2014 (37) & 2015 (28), 2016 (OTW), 2018, 2019
- Entrepreneur Member of the Rollins chapter of Sigma Nu Tau, the National Entrepreneurship Honor Society, 2019
- Woman of the Year 2015, Orange Appeal Magazine
- Central Floridian of the Year 2011 & 2015, 2016 runner up
- Businesswoman of the Year 2012 & 2015, Orlando Business Journal, nominated
- Female Executive of the Year, Orlando Business Journal, 2014
- Girl Scout Leader of the Year - Liberty Service Unit, 2012
- Bank of America, Neighborhood Excellence Award, 2011
- Feminist Leadership Award presented by Gloria Steinem at the Veteran Feminists of America 45th Anniversary Gala, 2011
- Juneteenth Hometown Hero, 2005
- 2000 & 2005 Executive of the Year – Executive Women's Council, Daytona Beach Chamber of Commerce
