= Psychological trauma in older adults =

Psychological trauma in adults who are older (usually more than 60 years), is the overall prevalence and occurrence of trauma symptoms within the older adult population. (The term psychological trauma is sometimes hereinafter referred to as trauma). This should not be confused with geriatric trauma. Although there is a 90% likelihood of an older adult experiencing a traumatic event, there is a lack of research on trauma in older adult populations. This makes research trends on the complex interaction between traumatic symptom presentation and considerations specifically related to the older adult population (e.g., the aging process, a lifetime prevalence of traumatic symptoms [otherwise known as lifetime trauma], etc.) difficult to pinpoint. This article reviews the existing literature and briefly introduces various ways, apart from the occurrence of elder abuse, that psychological trauma impacts the older adult population.

== Presentation ==
Psychological trauma in older adults can present differently depending on the type of traumatic experience and when it took place. If the traumatic experiences of an older adult were recurrent in childhood (see childhood trauma or complex trauma) or in adulthood, the experiences can have varying but lasting detrimental effects on an older adult's psychological well-being, health, and cognition.

Older adults who experienced childhood-based trauma have a long-term trauma history, which increases their likelihood of experiencing more severe negative psychological, health, and cognitive symptoms. Additionally, the timing of trauma exposure has the potential to influence both the manifestation of post-traumatic stress disorder (PTSD) symptoms and the psychosocial functioning of older adults. Generally, older adults who identify their most distressing traumatic event as occurring during childhood tend to exhibit more severe symptoms of PTSD and report reduced subjective happiness compared to older adults who have experienced trauma later in life. A specific example is the intersection between recurrent interpersonal trauma and PTSD symptoms as an older adult. Research suggests that this intersection in older adults can lead to a perpetuating cycle where both components contribute to the experience of chronic pain later in life.

Adulthood-based trauma considerations introduce the complexity of the interaction between an older adult's trauma presentation and potential neurocognitive components. Research indicates that older adults who have had PTSD are more likely to develop dementia than those who did not have PTSD. The neurocognitive effects of PTSD symptoms can also look similar to the neurocognitive effects of cognitive impairment in older adults.

Psychological trauma diagnosis in older adults is considered less common than in younger adults. However, older adults' symptom presentations may make it more difficult for healthcare providers to identify trauma as the cause of an individual's symptoms (e.g., if the individual exhibits somatic representations of trauma symptoms; see psychosomatic disorders). Some older adults may be more likely to report non-psychological symptoms and may not be aware that they may be experiencing trauma symptoms. Some trauma symptoms may emerge later on in life (known as Late-Onset Stress Symptomatology), which could make pinpointing a potential cause even more difficult. Considering cohort factors is also important. The majority of today's older adults grew up during a time when psychological trauma was just starting to be acknowledged. This can make identifying and treating trauma within this population more difficult because there may be a lack of awareness or willingness to perceive their symptoms from a different perspective.

Older adults who experienced trauma in their later years may also retain harmful symptoms associated with the normal aging process (see old age). For example, there are several research studies on older adults potentially developing PTSD after experiencing a fall. As people get older, they tend to experience more falls, leading to a fear of falling. A meta-analysis of these studies revealed that female older adults who were more frail had a greater likelihood of developing PTSD following a fall, compared to older adults who were less frail and had higher levels of psychological resilience. Older adults' past experiences paired with current perceptions and health conditions are likely to perpetuate various psychological disorders (i.e., depression, anxiety, and phobias related to older adult considerations such as falling) as well as worsen existing PTSD symptoms.

== Research ==
Research on psychological trauma in older adults is sparse, with some individual studies lacking empirical reliability and validity. In order to assess and treat psychological trauma in older adults, strong research is needed within scientific literature. This will help in creating psychological screeners for trauma, which can aid in differentiating trauma symptom from other health or psychological disorders. Trauma symptoms can manifest differently among older adults. While there isn't a PTSD screener specifically designed for the general older adult population, certain PTSD screeners have been successfully tested with veteran older adults and can effectively screen for PTSD.

In fact, most of the research on psychological trauma in older adults stems from the veteran population. PTSD in the older adult veteran population is a focal point of research with Veterans Affairs (VA; see Veterans Health Administration). The VA has been considered a leader in trauma research for decades. Considering that the concept of trauma originated with soldiers' experiences in war (i.e., trauma was labelled as "shell shock" or "war neurosis"), the VA closely monitors trauma development and treatment for veterans of all ages and identities. The results with aging veterans highlights the need to further understand psychological trauma within older adults more generally, including how it impacts their quality of life.

Research on trauma in older adults is relevant and applicable in clinical settings as well. The National Center for PTSD (NCPTSD) conducts clinical research through the VA by implementing and providing psychological treatment for veterans who have experienced trauma. This includes research into such treatments as cognitive processing therapy (CPT), eye movement desensitization reprocessing (EMDR), and prolonged exposure therapy (PE). The NCPTSD claims these three therapeutic orientations have a 53% success rate in PTSD symptom remission. Although research indicates that exposure therapies generally show effectiveness for treating trauma in older adults, PE has been specifically identified as a reliable therapeutic approach for this population. If an older adult has both psychological trauma and cognitive impairment, it is recommended to provide them with an adapted or modified version of an evidence-based therapeutic treatment. If an older adult with psychological trauma is considering taking medication concurrently with and as a supplement for therapy, the VA has identified four medications for PTSD treatment: fluoxetine, paroxetine, sertraline, and venlafaxine. While there is limited research on medication specifically for treating trauma in older adults, medication use in general (see pharmacotherapy) can be beneficial for psychological and health treatment. It is crucial to monitor medication half-lives and potential harmful interactions when taking multiple medications.
