= National Center for Trauma-Informed Care =

Mental health organizations in Maryland

- Website: https://www.traumainformedcare.chcs.org/

The National Center for Trauma-Informed Care is a United States based medical charity, funded by the Center for Mental Health Services (CMHS). It was created in 2005. Its stated purpose is to assist publicly funded agencies, programs, and services in making a cultural shift to a more trauma-informed environment — an environment intended to be more supportive, comprehensively integrated, and empowering for trauma survivors.

== Trauma-Informed Healing ==
Trauma-informed healing recognises the past history of traumas experienced by those seeking healing services as well as the impact of their traumatic experiences on the service provider. Policies and services that are enacted within trauma informed environments are based on a prevention model, and aim to create an approach that reduces the risk of retraumatisation while promoting healing and recovery. This approach focuses on increasing the safety and trust in the provider-consumer relationship and encourages resilience through self-care practices, stress management techniques, and the reduction of compassion fatigue.

Consumers who engage with such services may opt to become partners in this same environment, such as peer supporters, peer counselors, advocates providing leadership in state consumer and peer networks, or entrepreneurs.

== Paths to Healing ==
“Trauma-informed” is based on the understanding that the impact of violent experiences and damaging relationships affects not only the survivor's physical, mental, emotional, and economic well-being, but the spiritual as well. The isolating impact of trauma may make relationships more difficult. Talking about what happened may feel too vulnerable and risky. But healing often arises when other creative forms of expression are embraced.

Healing can be inspired through contact with the various arts such as creative writing, journaling, making music, visual expressions, and more. Whatever the art medium used, personal anonymity and room to communicate and interpret experience through the expression of art can give the survivor freedom in telling their story. Exploring their trauma in this way, survivors may experience shifts in physiology (from stress to relaxation) and attitude (from fear to creative inspiration).

== Involvement in Trauma-Informed Care ==
The Center for Mental Health Services (CMHS) National Center for Trauma-Informed Care (NCTIC) provides consultation, technical assistance, and training to revolutionize the way mental health and public health services are organized, delivered, and managed through trauma-informed change. The focus of NCTIC's work is providing useful support in helping providers move from caretaker to collaborator, and empowering the consumer and survivor with voice and choice.

NCTIC is dedicated to the proposition that, with a better integration of trauma into public health services, more trauma survivors and consumers will find their path to healing and wellness. Especially in settings where trauma services are already available, if these services are provided in a context of an agency that has not adopted a trauma-informed management and training orientation, then the effectiveness of the trauma services actually offered can be undercut. They believe that, with a greater public commitment to trauma-informed programs and systems for survivors, a wide range of health, behavioral health, and social problems will be lessened for generations to come.

NCTIC is funded by the U.S. Department of Health and Human Services, Substance Abuse and Mental Health Services Administration, Center for Mental Health Services under contract HHSS2832007000201 to the National Association of State Mental Health Program Directors.
