= Post-traumatic stress disorder in children and adolescents =

Post-traumatic stress disorder (PTSD) in children and adolescents or pediatric PTSD refers to pediatric cases of post-traumatic stress disorder. Children and adolescents may encounter highly stressful experiences that can significantly impact their thoughts and emotions. While most children recover effectively from such events, some who experience severe stress can be affected long-term. This prolonged impact can stem from direct exposure to trauma or from witnessing traumatic events involving others.

When children develop persistent symptoms (lasting over one month) due to such stress, which cause significant distress or interfere with their daily functioning and relationships, they may be diagnosed with PTSD.

== Signs and symptoms ==
Children experiencing PTSD may exhibit a range of signs and symptoms, which vary depending on their age and developmental stage. These commonly include:

- Re-experiencing the traumatic event: This can manifest as intrusive thoughts, flashbacks, or repetitive play that reenacts aspects of the trauma.
- Sleep disturbances: Nightmares and difficulty sleeping are common.
- Intense distress reactions: Children may become highly agitated or upset when exposed to reminders or triggers of the event.
- Negative alterations in mood and cognition include:
  - Reduced ability to experience positive emotions.
  - Persistent feelings of fear or sadness.
  - Irritability and frequent angry outbursts.
  - Social withdrawal or feelings of helplessness and hopelessness.
  - Emotional numbness or denial of the event's occurrence.
- Hyperarousal and reactivity. Symptoms in this area involve:
  - Heightened vigilance for potential threats.
  - An exaggerated startle response.
- Avoidance: Children may actively steer clear of places, people, or activities associated with the traumatic event.

Some symptoms of traumatic stress, such as restlessness, fidgeting, and difficulties with attention and organization, can overlap with those of attention-deficit/hyperactivity disorder (ADHD). This overlap can sometimes lead to misdiagnosis if the child's traumatic history is not considered.

=== Differences between pediatric and adult PTSD ===
The diagnosis of PTSD requires similar criteria for children and adults. However, evidence suggests that the appropriateness of this diagnostic model varies with age, with PTSD only becoming more "adult-like" later in adolescence. Consequently, these criteria have shown limited sensitivity in identifying PTSD in youth, particularly at younger ages. Psychiatric diagnosis often relies heavily on a patient's capacity to offer detailed insights into their own thoughts, feelings, and behaviors. The developing nature of advanced cognitive processes, such as metacognition, in younger individuals may restrict their ability to report symptoms fully. While obtaining diagnostic information from caregivers might seem like an alternative, parents' assessments of their children's PTSD symptoms often demonstrate limited accuracy in capturing certain aspects of the diagnostic criteria.

Children with PTSD may display some symptoms slightly different from adults. For instance, the dissociative subtype of PTSD, characterized by the additional symptoms of depersonalization or derealization is more common in children than in adults.

== Trauma ==
Post-traumatic stress disorder in children can arise from various highly distressing or life-threatening experiences. Almost two thirds of children and teenagers worldwide have experienced at least one serious negative event (adverse childhood experiences; ACEs) in their lives. The types and rates of these experiences differ depending on where children live and what kind of adversity is measured.

These traumatic events may include, but are not limited to:

- Maltreatment: Physical, sexual, or emotional abuse or neglect.
- Violence and crime: Directly experiencing or witnessing acts of violence, assault, or other criminal activity.
- Loss and bereavement: The serious illness, unexpected death, or threatened death of a close family member or friend.
- Disasters: Exposure to natural disasters (e.g., earthquakes, hurricanes, floods) or human-made disasters (e.g., fires, bombings).
- Accidents: Severe incidents such as serious motor vehicle collisions.
- Medical trauma: Intensive or invasive medical procedures, particularly for very young children, or prolonged hospitalization.

=== Child sexual abuse ===
Child sexual abuse is strongly linked to mental health issues throughout life, with PTSD being a common outcome. A large review found a significant connection between sexual abuse and PTSD in children, adolescents, and young adults. This link was similar for both boys (OR = 2.86) and girls (OR = 2.38), meaning that boys who experienced sexual abuse were about 2.86 times more likely to have PTSD than boys who did not, and girls were about 2.38 times more likely than girls who did not.

=== Pediatric Illness ===
Studies on children in pediatric intensive care units show a wide range in the number of patients who develop PTSD, from 13% to 84.6%. Many studies reported PTSD prevalence between 20–40%. Factors increasing the risk of PTSD in pediatric intensive care unit patients include certain medical interventions, child-specific factors, and aspects of the family environment. Commonly used medications in the intensive care units such as opioids, benzodiazepines, and midazolam are linked to PTSD. This may be because prolonged use of opioids and benzodiazepines can lead to withdrawal, affecting well-being, while midazolam might interfere with how traumatic memories are processed. Invasive procedures like intubation, surgery, and blood draws are also strongly associated with PTSD in children, possibly due to the pain, fear, and feeling of helplessness they can cause, which may become lasting traumatic memories.

== Risk factors ==
Not all children and adolescents who are exposed to traumatic events will develop PTSD. Individual vulnerability, the nature and severity of the trauma, existing support systems, and other factors influence the likelihood of developing the disorder.

=== Child characteristics ===
==== Genetics ====
It appears that both experiencing trauma and developing PTSD have some genetic component, meaning these aspects can run in families. Past research has looked at specific genes, but the results have not been very clear or consistent. More recent findings suggest that certain genes might interact with a person's experiences. For example, the FKBP5 gene seems to play a role: if someone has a particular version of this gene and experiences tough times early in life, it might affect how their body handles stress and potentially increase their risk for PTSD.

==== Demographics ====
The influence of age at the time of trauma on PTSD development remains a subject of ongoing research. Current evidence suggests that rather than age affecting trauma impact differently, PTSD may manifest differently across various developmental stages.

Female children and adolescents demonstrate higher rates of PTSD than their male counterparts. The relationship between ethnicity and PTSD remains unclear, though some studies indicate elevated PTSD symptoms among minority populations. However, this disparity may reflect higher rates of trauma exposure rather than inherent ethnic differences in vulnerability.

=== Trauma characteristics ===
Children and adolescents exposed to more severe traumas typically exhibit higher levels of PTSD symptoms. Additionally, children and adolescents who are more distant from the traumatic event generally report lower levels of distress.

A meta-analysis of 32 studies identified several factors during or immediately after a traumatic event that predict PTSD symptoms in children. Feeling highly threatened during the trauma and perceiving one's life to be in danger both showed a moderate connection to later PTSD. Other factors, such as feeling detached (dissociation) or confused during the trauma were also related to PTSD symptoms. For girls, the relationship between feeling threatened during the trauma and PTSD symptoms was stronger than for boys.

Interpersonal traumas, including sexual assault and physical violence, are associated with higher rates of PTSD compared to other trauma types. The risk of developing PTSD also increases with repeated trauma exposure.

=== Family characteristics ===
A family's overall well-being and how it functions are closely linked to a child's experience with PTSD. Better family functioning, including positive aspects like how emotions are expressed, how members communicate, and how connected and supportive they feel, is associated with fewer or less severe PTSD symptoms in children. Conversely, negative elements such as family conflict are linked to more severe PTSD, and these negative elements can have a stronger and more lasting impact on a child's symptoms compared to positive ones.

Child post-traumatic stress symptoms following acute trauma are associated with specific parental responses, including overprotective behaviors, avoidance of trauma-related discussions and reminders, and encouragement of distraction from trauma-associated thoughts and stimuli.

Peer and family support are related to PTSD in children, but the effect is small.

== Pathophysiology ==
Key brain regions involved in adult PTSD include the circuit formed by the amygdala, hippocampus, and prefrontal cortex. This network is one of the most thoroughly understood in behavioral neuroscience. Research on pediatric PTSD indicates that it shares some brain abnormalities with adult PTSD, such as reduced volume in the ventromedial prefrontal cortex (vmPFC) and impaired activation of the lateral prefrontal cortex. However, other features commonly seen in adult PTSD, like reduced hippocampal volume and hyperactivity in the amygdala and insula, have not been consistently observed in pediatric PTSD.

One explanation for these differences appears to be the delayed neurodevelopmental effects in pediatric PTSD. This includes the hippocampus gradually decreasing in volume, the amygdala's reactivity increasing, and the coupling between the amygdala and medial prefrontal cortex (mPFC) decreasing with age. Therefore, PTSD in youth may differ from adults due to both the heightened stress sensitivity of developing neural systems and the delayed full expression of childhood trauma's effects.

== Diagnosis ==
According to the DSM-5, Post-traumatic stress disorder is defined as occurring after an individual experiences or witnesses an event that involved actual or threatened death, serious injury, or sexual violence. Following such an event, the individual experiences recurrent, involuntary, and intrusive recollections, nightmares, or dissociative reactions (such as flashbacks). They also have significant distress or physical reactions when exposed to triggers or reminders of the event.

In addition to these re-experiencing symptoms, individuals with PTSD also show:

- Persistent avoidance: They avoid thoughts, feelings, people, places, or activities related to the trauma.
- Negative changes in thinking and mood: This can include being unable to recall important parts of the trauma (dissociative amnesia), having negative beliefs about themselves or the world, blaming themselves or others, experiencing negative trauma-related emotions, losing interest in activities, feeling detached from others, or having a reduced ability to express emotions.
- Changes in arousal and reactivity: Symptoms in this category include irritability, engaging in self-destructive or reckless behavior, being constantly on alert (hypervigilance), having an exaggerated startle response, difficulty concentrating, or problems with sleep.

All these symptoms collectively lead to significant distress for the individual.

=== PTSD for children 6 years and younger ===
The DSM-5 introduced Posttraumatic Stress Disorder for preschool children as a new developmental subtype, marking the first instance of an age-specific variant of an existing disorder within the DSM classification system. The diagnostic criteria received endorsement from an expert task force specializing in early childhood mental health. Although the supporting research primarily focused on preschool children aged three to six years, these studies frequently included toddlers between one and two years of age. The research demonstrated that implementing developmentally appropriate diagnostic criteria resulted in approximately three to eight times more children meeting the diagnostic threshold compared to the DSM-IV criteria.

The most significant changes in the DSM-5 subtype are in Criterion C (Avoidance or Negative Alterations in Cognitions). Symptoms requiring abstract thought were removed, and the requirement was reduced to only one symptom from either the avoidance or negative alterations clusters. Avoidance in young children is observed as avoiding external reminders or specific people, not just thoughts. Diminished interest might appear as restricted play, and detachment as social withdrawal.

== Comorbidity ==
Traumatic events may cause additional psychopathology. In children and adolescents with cancer, for instance, 21% have PTSD, 14% suffer from anxiety, and 20% from depression.

== Assessment ==
=== Screening ===
The British National Institute for Health and Care Excellence has published guidelines for treating people who have suffered trauma or PTSD. They recommend that when a child who has experienced a traumatic event is treated in an emergency department, the staff should explain to parents or caregivers about typical reactions to trauma and the possibility of developing PTSD. They should briefly describe potential symptoms, for example, nightmares, repetitive trauma-related play, intrusive thoughts, avoiding things related to the event, increased behavioral difficulties, problems concentrating, hypervigilance, and difficulties sleeping. Parents or caregivers should be advised to contact their general practitioner if these symptoms persist beyond one month.

=== Assessment tools ===
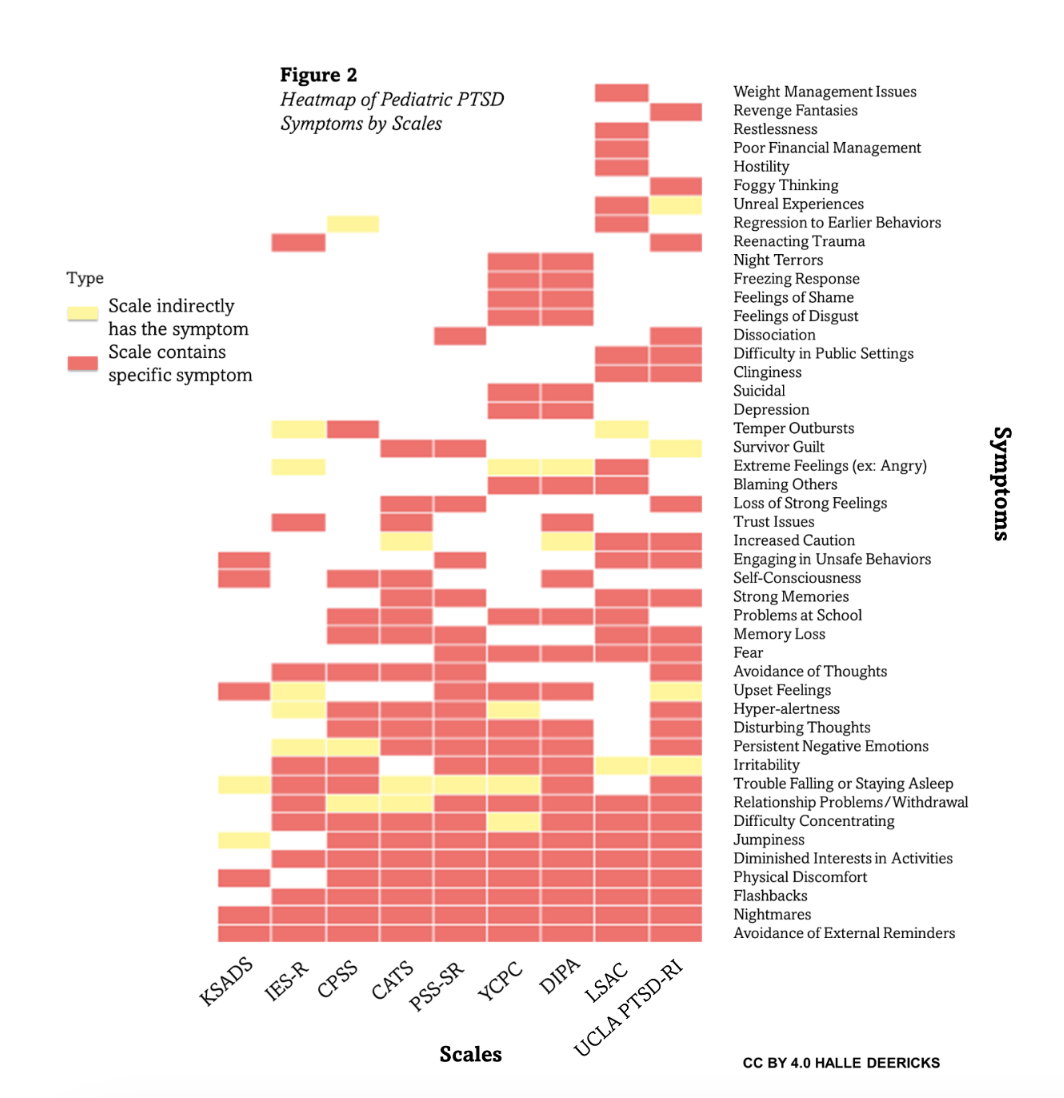
Heatmap of Pediatric PTSD Symptoms by Scales

Several tools are used to assess PTSD symptoms in children and adolescents:

==== Interview schedules ====
- The Clinician Administered PTSD Scale for Children and Adolescents (CAPS-CA) is a frequently used structured interview for diagnosing PTSD in 8–15-year-olds. It has been adapted from its DSM-IV format to align with DSM-5 diagnoses and simplified to involve only symptom frequency ratings, making it more child-friendly and easier to administer. The CAPS-CA has demonstrated good internal consistency, excellent interrater reliability, and adequate convergent validity.
- The UCLA PTSD Reaction Index (UCLA PTSD-RI) is an interview schedule designed for 6–18-year-olds. It has shown excellent internal consistency and test–retest reliability, good convergent validity, and is relatively quick to administer.
- The Child PTSD Symptom Scale for DSM-5 (CPSS-5-I) is a screening tool with 20 questions, typically taking about 20 minutes to complete. Patients rate various symptom items on a scale from 0 (not at all) to 4 (6 or more times a week/severe). Additionally, there are seven yes/no questions related to daily functioning. In one study, a score of 30.5 or higher on this scale was associated with a 93% sensitivity and 82% specificity for the development of PTSD. The CPSS-5-I is a widely used self-report measure that has also been adapted into an interview version. It exhibits excellent internal consistency, test–retest reliability, and interrater reliability.
- The Children's PTSD Inventory (CPTSDI) is a structured interview administered by a clinician, designed for pediatric patients aged 6 to 18 years. This inventory assesses PTSD symptoms, identifies the events that qualify as traumatic, and evaluates the patient's current functioning status. It is based on the DSM-IV diagnostic criteria. The Children's PTSD Inventory comprises 50 yes/no questions and takes approximately 18 minutes to complete. The CPTSDI demonstrates excellent internal consistency, interrater reliability, and test–retest reliability, along with good convergent validity.

==== Self-report scales ====
Free access child PTSD scales

Self-report questionnaires serve various purposes in assessing PTSD in children. For rapidly screening a large number of children, such as after a natural disaster, measures that are sensitive, specific, and quick to administer and score are essential.

- CRIES-8: An eight-item measure for screening, focusing on intrusion and avoidance symptoms. It has robust psychometric properties, established cut-points, is quick to administer, and available in multiple languages. While its main limitation is the limited scope of re-experiencing symptoms, an extended 13-item version addresses hyperarousal.
- Child Trauma Screening Questionnaire (CTSQ): A 10-item measure that is very quick to administer and effective for identifying PTSD cases.
- Child and Adolescent Trauma Screen (CATS): A newly developed measure that shows considerable promise for assessing DSM-5 PTSD symptoms and includes a trauma exposure screen.
- Child Post-Traumatic Cognitions Inventory: A useful index of negative trauma-related beliefs among 7–17-year-olds. It is available in a standard 25-item version and a 10-item version for easier clinical use, with numerous translations.
- Pediatric Emotional Distress Scale (PEDS): Uses caregiver report and has shown useful properties as a screening tool for young children.

== Prevention ==
The clearest way to prevent child PTSD is to prevent trauma. One way to accomplish this is by preventing the intergenerational transmission of Adverse Childhood Experiences (ACEs) from parents to their children. This requires careful assessment of parents' own past experiences, both adverse and positive, as these influence their current health and parenting. While guidelines encourage routine screening for ACEs in both children and parents, universal implementation faces barriers like feasibility and reporting concerns.

=== Interventions during pregnancy ===
Adverse Childhood Experiences (ACEs) and PTSD in pregnant and postpartum mothers can pose significant challenges, as the normal changes of pregnancy and new parenthood can trigger trauma reminders, potentially harming parent-child relationships from birth. Therefore, interventions starting during pregnancy, such as Legacy for Children, Perinatal Child-Parent Psychotherapy (P-CPP), Minding the Baby (MTB), and The Survivor Moms' Companion (SMC), are important. These programs, often drawing from models like the Nurse-Family Partnership, aim to build protective capacities by promoting healthy parent-child attachment, processing traumatic experiences, teaching coping skills, and providing comprehensive support, ultimately working to reduce maternal PTSD and depression symptoms while fostering positive child development and family resilience.

=== Interventions during early childhood ===
Several effective interventions exist for traumatized children aged birth to five years and their caregivers. Child-Parent Psychotherapy (CPP) is an evidence-based approach that uses the parent-child attachment to promote recovery, incorporating techniques like reframing beliefs, processing trauma, and co-regulating distress, while also supporting parents' own trauma recovery. Mom Power is a group-based intervention, drawing from CPP, that helps mothers with histories of adverse experiences manage trauma-related distress, build self-care skills, and improve attachment with their children. Child FIRST is a home-based program that combines direct intervention, often including CPP, with integrated referrals for mental health, practical needs, and early childhood education, aiming to enhance the parent-child relationship and foster family resilience while preventing further adverse experiences. All these approaches prioritize the critical role of the caregiver-child relationship in facilitating recovery from early childhood trauma.

== Management ==
=== Psychotherapy ===
A large review of studies used 56 randomized controlled trials with 5327 patients comparing 14 different types of psychotherapies and 3 control conditions. Of all the therapies, cognitive processing therapy (CPT), behavioral therapy (BT), and individual trauma-focused cognitive-behavioral therapy (TF-CBT) were the most effective psychotherapies for treating PTSD in young patients. These methods were found to be significantly superior to supportive therapy. Other therapies, including eye movement desensitization and reprocessing and group TF-CBT, were only better than no treatment at all. Similar results were seen for related depressive and anxiety symptoms. Psychodynamic therapy and family therapy were not effective.

Trauma-focused psychotherapies (CBT and other) focus on the memory and meaning of the trauma. Concerns that trauma-focused PTSD treatments might cause children and young people to drop out of therapy were investigated in a review of 40 studies. The findings showed that dropout rates for evidence-based trauma-focused treatments were similar to those for non-trauma-focused treatments or control groups, at around 12%. This indicates that trauma-focused therapies are well-tolerated by most youth and do not lead to higher rates of leaving treatment prematurely.

==== Cognitive behavioral therapy ====
Cognitive behavioral therapy (CBT) is an effective treatment for PTSD in children and adolescents. It is also an efficient method for treating related conditions, such as anxiety and depression, that may occur alongside PTSD. CBT significantly improves PTSD symptoms in children and adolescents who have experienced sexual abuse or trauma related to war. It is more effective for treating PTSD in children and adolescents between the ages of 7 and 18 years.

===== Trauma-focused cognitive behavioral therapies =====
Trauma-focused cognitive behavioral therapies (TF-CBTs) are the first-line treatment recommendation for pediatric PTSD. They lead to significant reductions in pediatric PTSD symptoms across short, mid, and long terms. TF-CBT is an effective treatment for post-traumatic stress symptoms in children, as well as for associated depressive, anxiety, and grief symptoms. It is superior to control conditions, aligning with international guidelines that recommend it as a first-line treatment.

TF-CBT is considered a "probably efficacious" intervention for preschool-aged children, since there are limited studies using different methods. When considering TF-CBT for preschoolers with PTSD symptoms, factors such as their language and cognitive abilities, family environment, cultural background, and the clinician's expertise should be taken into account.

===== Exposure therapy =====
Exposure therapy, a type of behavior therapy, effectively treats PTSD in children and adolescents. A review of studies found that exposure therapy notably improved symptoms compared to control groups with a large effect size. Exposure therapy is especially efficient for those who experienced only one type of trauma and for patients 14 years and older.

==== Eye movement desensitization and reprocessing ====
Eye Movement desensitization and reprocessing (EMDR) is recommended by the British National Institute for Health and Care Excellence as a treatment option if young people to do not engage in, or do not respond to, trauma-focused CBT. It is considered to be inferior to trauma-focused CBT, since it is better than no treatment at all but no better than supportive therapy.

=== Trauma-informed education ===
A trauma-informed educational approach includes broad school-wide strategies and specific intervention programs within schools. These approaches are guided by principles that help staff understand and acknowledge trauma's impact, recognize symptoms, and integrate trauma knowledge into practices to prevent re-traumatization. Key principles focus on safety, trustworthiness, peer support, collaboration, empowerment, and consideration of cultural, historical, and gender issues.

- School-wide approaches are often based on broad guidelines that schools need to adapt to their own unique organizational and cultural settings.
- Trauma programs aim to decrease symptoms of post-traumatic stress disorder, depression, and behavioral issues. These programs deliver interventions to students individually or in groups within the school setting. Examples include Cognitive Behavior Intervention for Trauma in Schools (CBITS) and Bounce Back. Research has demonstrated that these trauma programs are effective in reducing symptoms of depression and PTSD among students.

However, these trauma programs alone are not sufficient to establish a school-wide trauma-informed environment that would help lessen the impact of trauma and prevent re-traumatization. Recovery from trauma also involves daily interactions with school staff, as students who have experienced trauma require a safe and supportive environment that offers consistency. Furthermore, traumatic experiences can affect not only children but also school staff, who may suffer from secondary traumatization, compassion fatigue, and feelings of inadequacy.

The successful implementation of trauma-informed educational approaches relies on several important factors. These include professional development for staff, thorough planning for implementation, strong support from leadership, active engagement of all relevant parties, and gaining overall acceptance or "buy-in" from the school community.

=== Medication ===
The British National Institute for Health and Care Excellence has published guidelines for treating children with PTSD. According to the guidelines, no drug treatments should be offered for the prevention or treatment of PTSD in children and young people aged under 18 years. As of 2018, the committee found very little evidence on the use of drug treatments for pediatric PTSD. Furthermore, the limited evidence existing showed no significant benefits.

Research on pharmacotherapy for pediatric PTSD prevention has yielded very low confidence evidence. For example, studies on Propranolol showed no significant effect on PTSD severity in the short term (1–3 months) or on PTSD incidence over longer periods (1 month–7 years). Imipramine, even increased the risk of acute stress disorder severity.

=== Other ===
Animal-assisted interventions show promise for reducing PTSD and depression symptoms in children and adults. A meta-analysis found them to be superior to waitlists.

3,4-Methylenedioxymetamphetamine (MDMA)-assisted psychotherapy is an exploratory treatment for adult PTSD. MDMA is also considered for adolescents because it may reduce avoidance, help process trauma, strengthen the therapeutic relationship, and enhance learning and reappraisal related to trauma. Proposed adaptations for adolescents include focusing on motivation, therapeutic alliance, emotion management, direct exposure during sessions, integration of benefits, and family involvement. While potential risks for adolescents such as side effects, toxicity, misuse, and ethical issues need consideration, MDMA-assisted psychotherapy shows promise.

== Epidemiology ==
Approximately 15% to 43% of girls and 14% to 43% of boys experience at least one traumatic event during childhood and adolescence. Among these young people who have encountered trauma, between 3% and 15% of girls and 1% to 6% of boys subsequently develop PTSD. The prevalence of PTSD varies depending on the specific type of trauma experienced.

The National Comorbidity Survey Replication-Adolescent Supplement, a nationally representative study of more than 10,000 adolescents between ages 13 and 18, found that 5% of participants met lifetime criteria for PTSD. The condition was more prevalent among female adolescents compared to males (8.0% versus 2.3%), with prevalence rates increasing with age. Current PTSD rates, defined as symptoms occurring within the past month, were 3.9% overall. Comprehensive prevalence studies of PTSD in younger children within the general population have not been conducted.

The prevalence of PTSD in preschool-aged children that have experienced trauma is about 22%. This rate is three times higher following interpersonal or repeated trauma. Young children experience many of the same symptoms as older individuals, though developmental differences can lead to varied expressions of distress. When age-appropriate assessment and diagnostic tools are used, PTSD is diagnosed in young children at rates similar to older children and adults, often with co-occurring conditions. While most young children demonstrate resilience and recover from trauma, a significant minority (10–20%) may develop chronic and debilitating PTSD.

In Africa about 36% of children have PTSD. Children over 14 years old and those who experienced family deaths from traumatic events were more likely to have PTSD.

A meta-analysis on children and adolescent refugees and asylum seekers found that 23% of them suffered from PTSD.

== History ==
While Sigmund Freud first suggested that trauma might uniquely affect children, one of the earliest efforts to distinguish post-trauma symptoms between youth and adults came from Terr's reports on the "Children of Chowchilla." In July 1976, near Chowchilla, California, a school bus carrying 26 children and one adult was hijacked by three armed men, who then abducted them and held them for ransom in a buried box trailer. The captives courageously escaped. Following their reunion with families, medical professionals and local authorities quickly declared the children unharmed, assuring worried parents that the psychological impact of the abduction would likely be minimal, perhaps affecting only one child.

This perspective was considered reasonable at the time, as children were widely believed to be inherently resilient to trauma, despite some evidence suggesting otherwise. However, contrary to these initial assumptions, many of the kidnapping victims subsequently developed a severe range of emotional, behavioral, and cognitive symptoms. Despite their distress, the children remained untreated for months, partly because parents were reluctant to admit their child was among the few initially predicted to be affected. The expectation that these children would be completely resilient may have partly stemmed from a failure to recognize the distinct symptoms presented by trauma-exposed children compared to adults.

Since PTSD was first introduced in DSM-III, it has been acknowledged that both adults and children are vulnerable to traumatic experiences. The DSM, widely used for classifying mental health conditions, faced criticism because its diagnostic criteria for disorders like PTSD were largely developed and validated using adult populations. This raised concerns about applying DSM-IV PTSD criteria to young children, as it did not adequately account for their unique developmental differences in symptom presentation. Research highlighted that the DSM-IV underestimated PTSD in infants and preschoolers. This led to the development of the PTSD-AA (PTSD-Alternative Algorithm). The PTSD-AA modified DSM-IV symptoms to be more developmentally appropriate for young children, removing rarely observed symptoms and lowering the threshold for avoidance/numbing behaviors. This refined algorithm was based on empirical findings and endorsed by experts, improving the accuracy of PTSD diagnosis in very young children.

Starting with the DSM-5, the diagnosis of PTSD shifted to require meeting symptom thresholds across four distinct domains: intrusion, avoidance, negative alterations in thoughts or mood, and alterations in arousal and reactivity. This expanded structure, compared to the three domains in DSM-IV, was supported by research indicating a better fit for PTSD in adults. However, evidence suggests that the appropriateness of this diagnostic model varies with age, with PTSD only becoming more "adult-like" later in adolescence.
