= Trauma-informed mindfulness =

Being exposed to traumatic events such as war, violence, disasters, loss, injury or illness can cause trauma. Additionally, the most common diagnostic instruments such as the ICD-11 and the DSM-5 expand on this definition of trauma to include perceived threat to death, injury, or sexual violence to self or a loved one. Even after the situation has passed, the experience can bring up a sense of vulnerability, hopelessness, anger and fear.

Trauma is a global issue, as it impacts both the individual and the society they lived in. Those who experience trauma may not be able to perform their responsibilities in the same capacity, which can have a long-term impact on their community. In the United States, it is estimated that there are approximately 37 million emergency room visits that result in trauma on a yearly basis, and it is considered to be one of the five most costly medical conditions, with a nationwide cost of $406 billion.

Regardless of socioeconomic status, anyone is at risk experiencing a traumatic event, with at least one instance reported by 70.4% of the population. The races most impacted by trauma in the United States are white (59.86%), unspecified or other (28.24%), Black (6.4%), and Hispanic (5.5%).

In children and adolescents, exposure to trauma carries the risk of cognitive, emotional, and social impact, as well as considerations in the development of their mental health. Childhood exposure to stressful or traumatic events are associated with increased morbidity and mortality in adulthood.

== Post-traumatic stress disorder ==
Experiencing traumatic events can cause an individual to develop post-traumatic stress disorder (PTSD); this is seen more commonly in cases in which a perpetrator is involved. Among those who experience some symptoms of PTSD, between 10% and 20% of individuals have symptoms that persist past a month, and may cause impairment in daily life. Those who live with PTSD may have the reduced ability to work, with a total estimated loss of $3 billion yearly in the United States.

In veterans returning from combat in conflicts after 9/11, PTSD rates were observed at 9% immediately upon returning from deployment, and increased to 31% at one year after returning from deployment. Among US veterans, clinical and pharmaceutical treatments are under-utilized, in part due to the stigma of having a mental health condition.

Although research has contributed to the increased knowledge of PTSD, there are still many dilemmas and challenges in understanding the condition. One such obstacle is that PTSD is often comorbid with other conditions such as anxiety, depression, and substance use disorders (SUD). This can make it difficult to differentiate between symptoms as they can manifest simultaneously. There is also no clear cut definition for normal and abnormal behavior after a traumatic event, which further adds to the complexity of diagnosis and treatment.

== Treatment ==
The recovery trajectory of those who have experienced trauma is largely determined by their pre-trauma community characteristics, as the support system is an integral part of an individual's improvement. Even the perception of social support has been found to serve as buffer for those affected by PTSD.

Trauma-focused treatments for PTSD, including prolonged exposure (PE), and cognitive processing therapy (CPT) aim to address memories of the traumatic event or the thoughts and feelings that one may have related to the traumatic event. In contrast, non-trauma-focused treatments for PTSD are geared toward reducing symptoms through methods such as relaxation, stress inoculation training (SIT), and interpersonal therapy. Other psychotherapeutic interventions are also widely accepted, such as cognitive behavioral therapy (CBT), eye movement desensitization therapy (EMDR), brief eclectic psychotherapy (BET), narrative exposure therapy (NET), and written narrative exposure.

The American Psychological Association guidelines for treating PTSD in adults recommend several possible medications for prescription, including sertraline, paroxetine, fluoxetine, or venlafaxine.

== Mindfulness ==
The practice of mindfulness in the treatment of individuals with trauma has shown positive preliminary results. Studies on the topic have demonstrated to reduce levels of depression and anxiety, reduced instances of trauma-related symptoms, enhanced mood and coping mechanisms, and improvement in overall quality of life. When supplemented with medication or psychotherapy, mindfulness-based interventions employing postures, breath, relaxation, meditation, and yoga have been found to be effective in reducing trauma-related symptoms, regardless of trauma type.

In those with PTSD as a result of military combat, a tailored yoga course over the course of six weeks was shown to decrease PTSD symptoms and improve mindfulness; participants also reported decreased insomnia, as well as lower depression and anxiety scores.

The implementation of high-quality, structured mindfulness treatment for those who have had adverse childhood exposure to traumatic events, can help mitigate the negative effects of stress and trauma in both short-and long-term. Doing so has been shown to improve mental, behavioral, and physical outcomes into adulthood.

Nurses who experience compassion fatigue, a state of exhaustion and dysfunction as a result of prolonged and repeated exposure to stress, can become traumatized by indirect exposure to trauma from those suffering in their care. The use of mindful self-compassion training in such cases has been proven to decrease secondary trauma and burnout while increasing mindfulness and resilience.
