= Interpersonal trauma =

Psychological trauma

Interpersonal trauma is psychological trauma as a result of interactions between people. It can result in post-traumatic stress disorder (PTSD). Chronic, sustained interpersonal trauma can result in complex post-traumatic stress disorder, which has both symptoms of PTSD and also problems in developmental areas such as emotional self-regulation and interpersonal functioning. More than half of the incidents causing interpersonal trauma happen to children and teenagers.

== Common categories ==
- Child abuse
- Child neglect
- Child sexual abuse
- Intimate partner violence
- Infidelity, leading to Post infidelity stress disorder
- Sexual assault
- Community violence (witnessing or being victimized by intentional violence outside the home)
- Physical assault
- Human trafficking
- Historical trauma
- Combat-related trauma
