= C. Nadine Wathen =

Canadian researcher

- Born: July 19, 1968 (age 58)

Academic background
- Education: BA, Experimental Psychology, 1989, Dalhousie University; MA, Experimental Psychology, 1992, PhD, 2004, University of Western Ontario
- Thesis: The pause in menopause? : what informs women's decisions to discontinue hormone replacement therapy? (2005)
- Website: nadinewathen.ca

C. Nadine Wathen FCAHS (born July 19, 1968) is a Canadian researcher. She is a Full Professor and Tier 1 Canada Research Chair in Mobilizing Knowledge on Gender-Based Violence at the University of Western Ontario and the Academic Director of the Centre for Research on Health Equity and Social Inclusion.

== Early life and education ==
Wathen was born on July 19, 1968. She completed her Bachelor of Arts degree at Dalhousie University before enrolling at the University of Western Ontario (UWO) for her Master's degree and PhD. Following her PhD, Wathen held a Canadian Institutes of Health Research–Ontario Women's Health Council Fellowship.

== Career ==
Following her PhD and fellowship, Wathen accepted a faculty position at UWO as a professor in their Faculty of Information and Media Studies. Upon joining the faculty, she received a 5-year Canadian Institutes of Health Research (CIHR) New Investigator Award in Women's Health, with a focus on interventions to reduce violence against women. In 2011, she founded Western's Joint Graduate Program in Health Information Science, which offers both master's level and PhD degree options Two years later, she collaborated with Jen MacGregor and Barbara MacQuarrie to launch the first Canada-wide survey on the impact of domestic violence on workers and workplaces. The purpose of the survey was to help develop public policy in the areas of employment standards and occupational health and safety, such as paid leave for victims, as well as negotiate workplace supports for domestic violence survivors. The results of the survey were published in 2015, indicating that more than a third of domestic violence victims reported that it affected their ability to get to work, and more than half reported that it continued at or near work. At the same time, Wathen served as a Co-Principal investigator of the Preventing Violence Across the Lifespan (PreVAiL) Research Network, where she helped develop research, educational materials, and approaches to assist health professionals in better supporting survivors of violence. As a result of her efforts towards research and education on family violence, Wathen was inducted into the Royal Society of Canada's College of New Scholars, Artists and Scientists. An election into this college is for an "emerging generation of scholarly, scientific and artistic leadership."

Prior to the start of the 2019–20 academic year, Wathen became the first member of the Faculty of Information and Media Studies to be appointed a Tier 1 Canada Research Chair (CRC). In 2021–2022, she was asked to co-chair Western University's Action Committee on Gender-Based and Sexual Violence alongside Terry McQuaid. Beyond UWO, Wathen collaborates with researchers at the University of British Columbia on the EQUIP Healthcare program to enhance equity-oriented care in health and social services. As she specifically focuses on the area of Trauma and Violence Informed Care, Wathen led the development of a free online curriculum and related resources at the Gender, Trauma & Violence Knowledge Incubator. EQUIP also launched the Equity Action Kit of resources to help organizations combat substance use stigma and improve care. Her efforts were recognized in 2022 with an election to the Canadian Academy of Health Sciences.
