= The Art of Yoga Project =

- Founded: 2005
- Location: Palo Alto, California
- Website: www.theartofyogaproject.org

The Art of Yoga Project's (AYP) mission is to bring mindfulness-based practices to system-involved and other marginalized youth for their healing and empowerment.

The Art of Yoga Project recognizes that youth face the stress of inequity, injustice, and trauma - early and ongoing. They understand that youth require a predictable, safe, supportive environment to heal. Their model includes specially trained trauma-informed teachers who bring tools for self-awareness and self-regulation to move youth from vulnerability into resilience.

They are leaders in the movement to ensure mindfulness-based practices are accessible to all creating innovation collaborations within systems that serve youth. The program was founded in 2002 by yoga teacher and nurse practitioner Mary Lynn Fitton, and it became a 501(c)(3) non-profit organization in 2005.

== The Model ==
An overwhelming number of youth are caught in cycles of violence and abuse. The Art of Yoga Project is working to break this cycle. The Art of Yoga Project combines yoga, meditation, and expressive arts as part of essential, therapeutic interventions to regulate traumatized individuals’ nervous systems and bring them back into balance.[vi]

Their program is based on the Child Trauma Academy’s evidence-based Neurosequential Model of Therapeutics (NMT) [v] to address the particular needs of system-involved youth.

NMT guides the class sequencing by addressing emotional dysregulation, which is common in traumatized youth. Class structure mirrors “bottom-up” brain development by first regulating the brainstem (the “survival brain”) through sensory integration and self-regulation, then the limbic system (the “feeling brain”) through relational activities, and finally the prefrontal cortex (the “learning brain”) through cognitive activities.

Another way to explain this sequencing is with the “three R’s” described in the NMT —first Regulate, then Relate then Reason. The Neuroscience of Mindfulness video: http://theartofyogaproject.org/news/our-videos/

== Organization ==
Mary Lynn Fitton founded the Art of Yoga Project after noticing the widespread body image issues, teen pregnancies, and physical and sexual abuse among teenage girls she worked with as a nurse practitioner. She felt that yoga could be a way to improve the self-esteem of teenage girls trapped in a cycle of negativity. A large proportion of girls in the juvenile justice system are survivors of physical or sexual abuse, come from homes where domestic violence is common, and have engaged in self-inflicted violence.

== Impact ==
Since inception, The Art of Yoga Project has delivered over 15,000 classes to more than 10,000 unique youth.

The Art of Yoga Project quarterly surveys show at least 80% of youth consistently reporting improvements in interpersonal skills, pro-social behavior, and emotional regulation outside of class

Qualitative results suggest that the youth benefit greatly from an opportunity to feel safe and calm, a chance to learn how to best deal with their anger or negative emotions, and to spend time ‘being fully present in their bodies’ each day versus the typical dissociation trauma can bring.

Mentoring case studies show youth view themselves in a more positive and hopeful way; choose positive behaviors, and have improved relationships with family members, peers, teachers, and other care providers.

== Articles ==
- Palo Alto Weekly, Health and Fitness, Bad girls doing time learn art and yoga. Rehabilitation program teaches self-calming and accountability, February 14, 2007
- Yoga Journal, Artistic Freedom, Struggling teens find girl power through art and yoga, October 2007
