= Anna Baranowsky =

Canadian Clinical Psychologist

Anna B. Baranowsky
- Education: University of Ottawa
- Occupations: Clinical Psychologist and CEO

Anna B. Baranowsky is a Canadian clinical psychologist and the founder and CEO of the Traumatology Institute (TI). She works with trauma survivors and those with posttraumatic stress disorder (PTSD) on post-traumatic growth and recovery. Baranowsky also assists organizations and professionals who help trauma survivors. The mandate of the Traumatology Institute is to raise awareness about Post-Traumatic Stress and trauma informed care options.

== Career ==
Baranowsky founded the Traumatology Institute in 1998. The Traumatology Institute offers comprehensive trauma training and mental health care services with a specialization in Post-Traumatic Stress. The TI provides both in-class and online training opportunities under the direction of Dr. Baranowsky and her associates.

She serves on the board of directors of the Academy of Traumatology and is a Board Certified Expert in Traumatic Stress through the American Academy of Experts in Traumatic Stress and is recognized by The National Center for Crisis Management. She has published in the area of Post-Traumatic Stress, compassion fatigue, and therapeutic relationships (the Silencing Response).

Baranowsky is also the author of Trauma Practice: Tools for Stabilization & Recovery (2015, 3rd Ed., Baranowsky & Gentry) and What is PTSD? 3 Steps to Healing Trauma (2012, Baranowsky & Lauer), a 2013 International Book Award finalist (Health category).

She is recognized by the American Academy of Experts in Traumatic Stress, is a Green Cross Scholar, Registered Traumatologist and Trainer.

== Background ==
Baranowsky received her doctorate in Clinical Psychology at the University of Ottawa. She was named as one of the Top 20 Women in Defense World (Canadian Military) by Esprit de Corps (magazine) in March 2016.

== Traumatology Institute (Canada) ==
The Traumatology Institute (Canada) was established in 1998 following intensive course development at Florida State University in 1997 with traumatologists Anna B. Baranowsky, J. Eric Gentry, Charles Figley, and Kathleen Dunning.
