= Traumatology Institute (Canada) =

- Type: Corporation
- Industry: Mental Health; training
- Founded: 1998
- Key people: Anna Baranowsky, Founder/CEO
- Website: psychink.com

The Traumatology Institute (Canada) is an international mental health consulting and training organization focused on after trauma care located in Toronto, Ontario, Canada.

The mandate of the Traumatology Institute is to raise awareness about Post-Traumatic Stress and trauma informed care options. It was established following intensive course development at Florida State University in 1997 with Dr. Anna B. Baranowsky, Dr. J. Eric Gentry, Dr. Charles Figley, and Kathleen Dunning.

Baranowsky established the Traumatology Institute (Canada) in 1998. The curriculum leads to competency in Field Trauma Response, Clinical Traumatology, Community & Workplace Traumatology, Compassion Fatigue Care, School Crisis Response Certificate Program, Justice/Corrections Traumatologist and the Trauma Recovery Program Online.

The Traumatology Institute Training Curriculum (TITC) provided foundational training for those Certified Traumatologists involved in recovery interventions for over 4,700 people following the September 11, 2001 terrorist attacks in New York City and thousands of traumatologists nationally and internationally.

Baranowsky is the author of Trauma Practice: Tools for Stabilization & Recovery (2015, 3rd Ed., Baranowsky & Gentry) and What is PTSD? 3 Steps to Healing Trauma (2012, Baranowsky & Lauer), a 2013 International Book Award finalist (Health category).
