= Trauma focused cognitive behavioral therapy =

Therapy

- Specialty: Psychology

Trauma focused cognitive behavioral therapy (TF-CBT) is an evidence-based therapeutic approach that aims at addressing the needs of individuals with post-traumatic stress disorder (PTSD) and other difficulties related to traumatic life events. This treatment was developed and proposed by Drs. Anthony Mannarino, Judith Cohen, and Esther Deblinger in the 1990s. The goal of TF-CBT is to provide psychoeducation to both the victim and non-offending caregivers, then help them identify, cope, and re-regulate maladaptive emotions, thoughts, and behaviors. Research has shown TF-CBT to be effective in treating childhood PTSD and with children who have experienced or witnessed traumatic events, including but not limited to physical or sexual victimization, child maltreatment, domestic violence, community violence, accidents, natural disasters, and war. While originally studied as a treatment for children and adolescents, its use has more recently expanded to include adult patients. Additionally, TF-CBT has been applied to and found effective in treating complex post-traumatic stress disorder (CPTSD).

== Description ==
TF-CBT is a treatment model that incorporates various trauma-sensitive intervention components. It aims at individualizing TF-CBT techniques to the patient and their circumstances while maintaining a therapeutic relationship with both the patient and parent. TF-CBT treatment can be used with children and adolescents who have experienced traumatic life events. It is a short-term treatment (typically 12–16 sessions) that combines trauma-sensitive interventions with cognitive behavioral therapy strategies. It can also be used as part of a larger treatment plan for children with other difficulties. TF-CBT includes individual sessions for both the child and the parents, as well as parent-child joint sessions.

== Major treatment phases and components ==
Major components of TF-CBT include psycho-education about childhood trauma and individualizing relaxation skills. There are 3 treatment phases (stabilization, trauma narration and processing, and integration and consolidation). These phases include 8 different components throughout these sessions, denoted by the 'PRACTICE' acronym seen below. The provider will facilitate 4-5 sessions each phase, while the PRACTICE components are delivered in sequential order.

- Psychoeducation and Parenting skills
- Relaxation
- Affective Expression and Regulation
- Cognitive Coping
- Trauma Narrative Development and Processing
- In Vivo Gradual Exposure
- Conjoint Parent-Child sessions
- Enhancing Safety and Future Development

=== Phase 1: Stabilization ===
Psychoeducation and parenting skills. The child and caregiver are taught about trauma responses and coping mechanisms. Validating their emotions about their trauma responses is crucial. Caregivers are also provided with strategies to assist their child in responding to trauma responses. Education on trauma reminders (e.g., the cues, people, places etc. associated with the trauma event) helps explain to children and caregivers how PTSD symptoms are maintained. An additional goal of many psychoeducation sessions is to explain the role of the brain in PTSD symptomatology. Generally, the amygdala, or the "fear center" of the brain, is hyper-responsive, and the prefrontal cortex, which is involved in processing, decision making, and down-regulation, is less active, or even reduced in volume. Usually, the prefrontal cortex will work to process the signals sent through the amygdala, assisting in regulated responding to stressful events. These connections have been found to be reduced in patients with PTSD, further explaining the heightened levels of fear responding to trauma reminders. This information can be broken down in several "child-friendly" methods (e.g., the hand model of the brain) and efficiently leads into the second module of TF-CBT: relaxation.

Relaxation. The child and caregiver are educated on skills that inform relaxation in order to cope with their stress responses. Some examples of techniques taught are progressive muscle relaxation, paced breathing, or guided visualization.

Affective Expression and Regulation. This component assists the child in becoming more comfortable or knowledgeable regarding the expression of feelings and thoughts, so that they may practice and develop skills in order to manage their stress response. The caregivers are educated on these skills and encouraged to practice using the emotion-language taught in session when trauma reminders are brought up at home.

Cognitive Coping. This component helps both the child and caregiver recognize maladaptive thoughts, feelings, and behaviors and replace them with more accurate responses. This section can be more challenging for clients, particularly younger children. The cognitive triangle (thoughts, feelings, and behaviors) is used to exemplify how our cognitive, emotional, and behavioral processes interact. Children are guided through the identification of negative everyday thoughts (e.g., I sit alone at lunch because no one likes me), and these skills are then adapted to the negative thoughts surrounding the traumatic event (e.g., "this happened to me because I am a bad kid").

=== Phase 2: Trauma Narration and Processing ===
Trauma Narrative Development and Processing. This is an interactive process that allows the child to address specific details about their experience with trauma. A written summary is developed through a creative medium, which serves as a tool to process these reactions. This content is then shared with the caregiver, in order to give the opportunity for the caregiver to also process these cognitions.

=== Phase 3: Integration and Consolidation ===
In Vivo Gradual Exposure. This is the only optional component within TF-CBT. The caregiver and child develop a fear hierarchy and develop strategies to face each fear. The caregiver is crucial in this session, as they must give consistent encouragement and persistence for the child to use their relaxation and TF-CBT skills.

Conjoint Parent-Child Sessions. Direct communication is encouraged between child and caregiver to continue open communication about the trauma experience, and other important issues before treatment concludes.

Enhancing Safety and Future Development. Practical strategies are developed that assist in enhancing the child's sense of safety and trust.

== Treatment Sessions ==
Unless it is a conjoint parent-child session, each session is about 1 hour, and the therapist spends 30 minutes with the child and 30 minutes with the parent. In the conjoint parent-child sessions, the therapist meets with the caregiver alone for 5–10 minutes, then the child alone for 5–10 minutes, then both caregiver and child together for 40–50 minutes.

=== Child-specific sessions ===
During the child therapy sessions, the therapist focuses on relaxation training such as deep breathing and muscle relaxation skills, emotion regulation (identifying feelings), a trauma narrative and processing (discussing the overwhelming events and associated feelings), as well as cognitive coping strategies (identifying and replacing negative thoughts).

=== Parent-specific sessions ===
Parents or primary caregivers are considered as the central therapeutic agents for improvement in TF-CBT. During the parent sessions, the therapist discusses the appropriateness of the treatment and safety plans with the parents and encourages positive parenting skills to maximize effective parenting. These sessions are important in helping the caregiver use and model specific coping skills for their own psychopathology for their child to show how they can manage their own symptoms.

=== Parent-child conjoint sessions ===
During the conjoint sessions, the therapist shares the trauma narratives and challenges to incorrect/negative thoughts as a means to encourage and facilitate parent-child communication. The therapist would only intervene when inaccurate cognitions were not addressed.

=== Group sessions ===
Group TF-CBT is an alternative to individual TF-CBT that reduces individual therapist hours and provides relief after disasters or in areas with limited resources. Similar to individual TF-CBT, group TF-CBT involves both child and caregiver and utilizes the 'PRACTICE' elements, typically delivered through 12 structured sessions that target the reduction of distress and feelings of shame.

== Evaluation of effectiveness ==
TF-CBT is considered the gold standard for treating PTSD and related symptoms in children and adolescents exposed to trauma. A meta analysis that examined 28 randomized control trials concluded that TF-CBT was an effective treatment and supported international guidelines that recommended its use as first-line treatment. Randomized clinical trials examining the efficacy of TF-CBT have found it to be an effective treatment plan for a variety of disorders in both children and adolescents. TF-CBT has been proven to effectively reduce symptoms of PTSD, depression, anxiety, externalizing behaviors, sexualized behaviors, and feelings of shame in children who have experienced trauma. TF-CBT has been shown to improve positive parenting skills and support of the child through the enhancement of parent-child communication.

A study examining the combinatorial effect of TF-CBT with sertraline has found that there were only minimal benefits associated with adding sertraline to the treatment, providing evidence for an initial trial of TF-CBT before medication. Evidence has also shown that TF-CBT is more successful than control groups despite whether it is delivered in a group format or individually. CBT is currently being researched for its effectiveness on therapy compared to other types of therapeutic interventions. Most of these studies have been conducted in outpatient research clinics.

While TF-CBT has been shown to be just as effective as Eye movement desensitization and reprocessing (EMDR) for the treatment of chronic post-traumatic stress disorder (PTSD) in adults, the results were tentative given low numbers in the studies, high drop out rates, and high risk of experimenter bias.

== Methods of access ==
=== Therapist ===
TF-CBT can be delivered by a variety of mental health professionals ranging from clinical social workers, counselors to psychologists and psychiatrists. Qualified therapists are required to be rostered or nationally certified in TF-CBT. Part of the training for this treatment includes an online TF-CBT certified training course. Additional criteria are required in order for a clinician to be rostered or nationally certified. It is recommended that the practitioner not only complete the online training course, but also attend a multi-day in-person training, and receive continuing supervision for 6–9 months from TF-CBT supervisor or consultant, while also practicing with families who have experienced trauma.

=== Implementation and adaptations ===
Since its development in the 1980s, TF-CBT has been used by therapists in many countries such as Australia, Cambodia, Canada, China, Denmark, Germany, Japan, the Netherlands, Norway, Pakistan, Sweden, United States, and Zambia. In some US states, implementation has been done in collaboration with the Substance Abuse and Mental Health Services Administration National Child Traumatic Stress Network. It has also been used with children in the foster care system, with those who have suffered from traumatic life events, including the 9-11 terrorist attacks, and those who experienced Hurricane Katrina.

TF-CBT has also been adapted to different cultures, including Latino populations. The treatment manual book has been translated into a variety of languages, such as Dutch, German, Japanese, Korean, and Mandarin. Because TF-CBT can be implemented by local lay counselors, it makes it a feasible mental health resource option in low and middle income countries, or in areas with low-resources.

In the wake of the COVID-19 pandemic there was a shift from in-person to remote delivery of psychotherapy. Because of the increase in demand for trauma-focused treatment in trauma-affected areas, practitioners have been able to facilitate TF-CBT virtually. Virtual TF-CBT therapy is more cost effective and has increased access to psychotherapy.

Many children are exposed to multiple events, or chronic trauma. These persistent experiences of traumatization impact a child's ability to form primary attachments, which may lead to an array of difficulties and is often referred to as "complex trauma." Complex trauma has sometimes been viewed as more difficult to treat, as its characterized by heightened levels of affective dysregulation, difficulties with attachment security, dissociation, and a fragmented sense of self. More recent research has identified TF-CBT as an effective approach for treating children with complex post-traumatic stress, one article finding that those with complex PTSD showed a greater reduction in their symptoms following treatment than those who had non-complex PTSD. In the United States, the concept of complex trauma is recognized, but it is not considered a distinct diagnosis based on the text revised version of the Diagnostic and Statistical Manual of Mental Health Disorders (DSM-5-TR). Countries other than the United States who use the International Classification of Diseases (ICD) have recently recognized complex PTSD (CPTSD) as its own disorder in the ICD-11 revised edition. The benefits of its inclusion in the ICD-11 are that it may lend to more individualized treatments that better address the nature of the trauma, as well as contribute to the research pool surrounding stress-related disorders. Some listed challenges, especially in light of its consideration to be added to the DSM-5, were that complex trauma may function better as a purely dimensional disorder, which is not reflective of the current diagnostic system, and that there is not enough identified psychometric properties to warrant its inclusion.
