= National Child Traumatic Stress Network =

US organization to support traumatized children

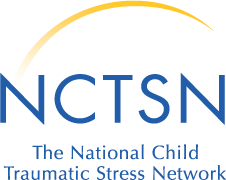
- Founded: 2000; 26 years ago
- Website: nctsn.org

The National Child Traumatic Stress Network (NCTSN) is an American organization whose "mission is to raise the standard of care and improve access to services for traumatized children, their families, and communities throughout the United States". According to its website, the NCTSN "offers training, support, and resources to providers who work with children and families exposed to a wide range of traumatic experiences, including physical and sexual abuse; domestic, school, and community violence; natural disasters, terrorism, or military family challenges; and life-threatening injury and illness."

NCTSN supports trauma-informed care with a program called the Child Welfare Trauma Training Toolkit.

== History ==
The NCTSN is coordinated by the UCLA-Duke University National Center for Child Traumatic Stress, and is a collaboration that as of 2012 has 60 members and a network of more than 150 centers and thousands of partners throughout the US. It was named in honor of Yale physician Donald J. Cohen, and was established in 2000 by the US Congress.

The NCTSN is a resource for dealing with tragedies like the Sandy Hook Elementary School shooting.
