= Traumatic bonding =

Emotional bond with perpetrator of abuse

Traumatic bonding, also referred to as trauma bonding, is the process of an abuse victim developing a strong emotional bond with the perpetrator of the abuse (not with other survivors of the same abuse). The two main factors that contribute to the establishment of a trauma bond are a power imbalance in the relationship (e.g., whether the abuser has control over the victim in some way) and intermittent rewards and punishments. Intermittent rewards and punishments means that the abuser will be violent or cruel one day, and then be kind or loving another day; the victim endures the abuse in the expectation that the abuse will be temporary, albeit in a recurring cycle of abuse that predictably returns to abusive behavior.

Trauma bonding is not an emotional bond between survivors of a shared traumatic experience. Trauma bonding can occur within abusive romantic relationships, platonic friendships, parent-child relationships, incestuous relationships, cults, hostage situations, sex trafficking (especially that of minors), hazing or tours of duty among military personnel.

Trauma bonds are based on terror, dominance, and unpredictability. As the victim develops a stronger emotional bond with an abuser, it can lead to cyclical patterns of conflicting emotions in the victim. Frequently, victims in trauma bonds do not have agency, autonomy, or an individual sense of self. Their self-image is an internalization of the abuser's conceptualization of them.

Trauma bonds have severe detrimental effects on the victim. Some long-term impacts of trauma bonding include remaining in an abusive relationship, adverse mental health outcomes like low self-esteem and negative self-image, cynicism, an increased likelihood of depression and bipolar disorder, and perpetuating a generational cycle of abuse. Victims who develop trauma bonds are often unable or unwilling to leave these relationships. Many abuse victims who experience trauma bonding return to the abusive relationship.

The concept was described by psychologists Donald Dutton and Susan Painter in the 1980s.

== Recent developments and contemporary research ==
=== Weaponized attachment ===
Weaponized attachment is a pattern of manipulation in which an emotional bond, formed through shared trauma, emotional vulnerability, and intense affection, is deliberately created then exploited to control another person. By recognizing that abusers intentionally cultivate then exploit emotional attachment, Mags Lesiak reconceptualizes trauma bonding as a strategic system of coercive control rather than a victim's psychological response to trauma. The emotional attachment is maintained through intermittent reinforcement by alternating care and cruelty, described as a "two-faced soulmate" profile in which perpetrators combine intense affection with sudden withdrawal, secrecy, or hostility to create psychological captivity even without physical force.

Weaponized attachment shifts the focus of trauma bonding to the intentional actions of the perpetrator and has implications for policy and frontline practice. It is argued that risk tools measuring domestic partner violence need to consider coercive control as a mechanism of abuse with or without recent physical violence. The framework also suggests that professionals in mental health and social work should be trained to recognize the "two-faced soulmate" perpetrator profile and their intentional actions and use a weaponized attachment lens to place responsibility on the perpetrator's manipulations rather than the victim's psychology.

== Context ==
In the 1980s, Donald G. Dutton and Susan L. Painter explored the concept of traumatic bonding theory in the context of abusive relationships and domestic violence. This work was then further studied in the contexts of parent-child relationships, sexual exploitation, and more. Patrick Carnes described trauma bonding as "the misuse of fear, excitement, sexual feelings, and sexual physiology to entangle another person." Traumatic bonding is also described as "[a] strong emotional attachment between an abused person and his or her abuser, formed as a result of the cycle of violence." Carnes also studied traumatic bonding theory in the context of betrayal, which involved the exploitation of the victim's trust and/or sense of power by the abuser.

=== Establishment ===
Trauma bonds are formed in abused-abuser and/or victim-victimizer dynamics. A victim can form a trauma bond with an abuser in the presence of a perceived threat from the abuser. Trauma bonds also form when the victim believes the abuser will follow through with a threat, when the victim perceives some form of kindness from the abuser, when the victim is isolated from outsider perspectives, and when the victim perceives a lack of ability or capacity to leave the situation.

The first incident of abuse is often perceived as an anomaly, a one-off instance occurring at the beginning of a seemingly healthy and positive relationship that is often not very severe. Furthermore, the expression of affection and care by the abuser following the incident pacifies the victim and instills in them the belief that the abuse is not recurring. However, repeated instances of abuse and maltreatment later generate a cognitive shift in the victim's mind: that preventing the abuse is not in their power. When the inability to escape the abuse becomes apparent, the emotional trauma bond is already strong.

Two main factors facilitate forming and continuing a trauma bond: a power imbalance and intermittent reinforcement.

==== Power imbalance ====
For a trauma bond to persist, a power differential must exist between the abuser and the victim such that the abuser is in a position of power and authority and the victim is not. Inequality in power can produce pathologies in individuals that can fortify the trauma bond. Upon experiencing intermittent punishment from the abuser or dominant individual, who is in a position of high power, the victim may internalize the abuser's perception of themselves. This may result in a tendency for the victim to blame themselves in situations of violence perpetrated by the abuser, which can negatively impact the victim's self-concept.

A negative self-appraisal can maximize the emotional dependency on the abuser and the cyclical nature of this dependency. Negative self-concept can eventually lead to the formation of a strong emotional bond from the victim to the abuser (i.e., to the person who is in a position of power and authority from the person who is not). Furthermore, physical, emotional, and sexual abuse can be used to maintain the power differential. This dynamic is also maintained via the interaction of the abuser's sense of power and the victim's sense of powerlessness and subjugation.

==== Intermittent reinforcement ====
Intermittent reinforcement of rewards and punishments is crucial to establishing and maintaining a trauma bond. In trauma bonding, the abuser intermittently maltreats the victim through physical, verbal, emotional, and/or psychological abuse. This maltreatment is interspersed with positive behaviors like expressing affection and care, showing kindness, giving the victim gifts, and promising not to repeat the abuse. Alternating and sporadic periods of good and bad treatment serve to reinforce the victim intermittently.

The pervasiveness of learning something through intermittent reinforcement can be elucidated by drawing from learning theory and the behaviorist perspective. In the presence of an aversive stimulus, reinforcement through rewards in unpredictable ways is a key component of learning. When the learner is unable to predict when they will get the reward, learning is maximized. Similarly, the intermittent expressions of affection and care are unexpected, and the inability to predict them makes them more sought after. Intermittent reinforcement produces behavioral patterns that are tough to terminate. Thus, they develop incredibly strong emotional bonds.

=== Maintenance ===
A trauma bond can be maintained by keeping the power imbalance and the intermittency of abuse intact.

Trauma bonds can also be maintained if the victim is financially dependent on the abuser or has some investment in the relationship, such as a child with the abuser.

Cognitive dissonance theory can also explain the maintenance of a trauma bond; it postulates that when individuals experience a conflict between their beliefs and actions, they are motivated to reduce or eliminate the incongruence to minimize the psychological discomfort. In this vein, victims may distort their cognition about the trauma and violence of the relationship to maintain a positive view of the relationship. This can involve rationalizing the abuser's behavior, justifications, minimizing the impact of the abuser's violence, and/or self-blaming.

Furthermore, research shows that the memory of instances wherein abuse was experienced is dissociated or state-dependent, meaning that the memories of abuse only fully resurface when the situation is similar in intensity and experience to the original situation of terror.

If and when the victim finally decides to leave the abusive relationship, the immediate relief from the traumatizing violence will begin to abate, and the underlying, deep attachment formed from intermittent reinforcement will begin to surface. This current period of vulnerability and emotional exhaustion will likely trigger memories of when the abuser was temporarily affectionate and caring. In the desire to receive that affection once more, the victim may try to return to the abusive relationship.

Strong social support can be a protective factor in preserving the victim's functioning and providing a buffer in traumatic situations.

=== The role of attachment ===
John Bowlby maintained that secure attachment was an evolutionary human need that superseded even the need for food and reproduction. Attachment has been explored in depth in caregiver-child dynamics, but recent research has shown that the principles that explain attachment between caregivers and infants can also explain attachment throughout one's life span, specifically in the context of intimate relationships and romantic bonds.

Attachment bonds formed during early life lay the foundation for interpersonal relationships, interactions, personality characteristics, and mental health in the future. Infants usually form attachments with their parents or immediate caregivers. Harlow's research on monkeys shows that infant monkeys form attachment bonds even with abusive mothers (in the experimental setup, the abusive 'mother' was a monkey made out of fabric who delivered mild shocks to the infant monkey or flung the infant monkey across the arena).

These findings also apply to human attachment bonds. Even in situations where immediate caregivers are abusive, human infants still tend to attach to them; rejection from a caregiver only enhances the efforts to increase proximity to them and establish an attachment bond with them.

Furthermore, in situations of danger, humans seek increased attachment. When ordinary pathways of attachment are unavailable, people tend to turn to their abusers. This leads to strong bonds and deep emotional connections with abusers. This attachment—both to abusive caregivers and to other abusers in the absence of a main caregiver—may be adaptive in the short run as it may aid survival. But in the long run, this attachment is maladaptive and can lay the foundation for, increase vulnerability to, and even directly lead to trauma bonding.

=== Stockholm syndrome ===
The concept of trauma bonding is often conflated with Stockholm syndrome. Although there are overarching similarities between the two, especially in the context of developing an emotional bond with one's abuser, trauma bonding and Stockholm syndrome are distinct from one another. The main difference is the direction of the relationship.

In other words, in the case of Stockholm syndrome, the emotional connection is reciprocal, such that the abuser also appears to develop an emotional connection towards the abused and harbor positive feelings for the abused, in addition to the abused developing an emotional bond with the abuser.

== Realms of existence ==
=== In abusive relationships ===
Although the victim may disclose the abuse, the trauma bond means that the victim may wish to receive comfort from the very person who abused them.

— PACE UK

Unhealthy, or traumatic, bonding occurs between people in an abusive relationship. The bond is stronger for people who have grown up in abusive households and who believe abuse to be a normal part of relationships. On the psychometric scale for Stockholm syndrome, the four main components are: justifying an abuser through cognitive distortions, damage, ongoing psychological effects of abuse, and love.

Initially, the abuser is inconsistent in approach, increasing in intensity over time. As the bond progresses, it may become more difficult for victims to leave abusers with whom they have bonded. Research indicates that abuse victims form trauma bonds largely based around the increasingly brief moments of calm and positive emotional interraction they have with their abusive partner, while minimising or excusing escalating emotional, mental, or physical aggression. Due to the intense nature of the trauma bond when it first forms between victim and abuser, time does not appear to dampen or reduce the connection an individual feels towards their abusive partner. Additionally, victims of intimate partner abuse often report a decreasing sense of self worth and increasing sense of shame or guilt over the course of their relationship, both of which contribute to greater difficulty in accepting the nature of the abuse dynamic. An individual may begin to feel responsible for their own inabilty to escape or prevent the abuse they have experienced, which further entrenches their sense of 'belonging' to their abusive partner and/or the established abusive dynamic. This may be even further entrenched by societal stigmatisation of victimhood and corresponding self-blame. Victims of IPA who have trauma bonded with an abusive partner may also be hesitant to leave the relationship when they have children with their abusive partner and/or when they are experiencing financial constraints and rely on their abusive partner for shelter and financial security.

==== Battered women ====
Initial research about battered women held the view that a victim's return to an abusive relationship was an indicator of a flawed personality and, more specifically, masochism. However, this view was perpetuated by the "just-world fallacy", the cognitive bias towards the idea that people "get what is coming for them". The tendency to victim-blame arises from the belief that the world is a just and fair place where the victim is seen as deserving of any negative consequences. However, research on battered women and research on traumatic bonding have shown that that is not the case. In terms of battered women's decision to stay in or return to an abusive relationship, many factors are at play, ranging from family history and role expectations to access to resources to the dynamics of the relationship itself. A crucial part of the relationship's dynamic is the existence of a trauma bond. Maltreatment interspersed with periods of kindness aids in the formation of a trauma bond that makes the victim harbor positive feelings towards the abuser.

Among battered women, a three-phase process can explain the intermittent reward-punishment cycle. During phase one, there is a gradual increase in tension, followed by an "explosive battering incident" in phase two, which is then followed by a peaceful expression of love and affection from the abuser during phase three. These phases' recurring and cyclical nature gives rise to a trauma bond.

=== Sex trafficking ===
Trauma bonds are extremely common in situations of sex trafficking, child grooming, commercial sexual exploitation of children (CSEC), and pimp-prostitute relationships.

==== Grooming ====
Child grooming involves establishing and maintaining trauma bonds between the child and the abuser. Along with the factors of power imbalance and intermittent reinforcement that contribute to trauma bonding, child grooming also necessitates gaining the trust of those around the child. Grooming also involves gaining the child's trust while simultaneously violating their boundaries. Treats and trips are used as bribes to both gain access to the child as well as ensure that they comply. Intense attachments coupled with cognitive distortions deepen the bond.

A 2019 case study explores the life of one individual who was groomed. The victim's perception of the abuser as a benefactor, a substitute parent, and a mind controller all contributed to the development of a traumatic bond between the victim and the abuser. In terms of being a benefactor, the abuser in this case study went above and beyond to give the victim what they needed. From getting the victim a job to gifting them a plot of land for their first house, the abuser was always present as a benefactor. The abuser also acted as a substitute parent, advising and offering emotional support in times of crisis. The roles of the abuser as a benefactor and substitute parent constituted the good treatment necessary to establish a trauma bond. In contrast, the abuser's role as a mind controller involved controlling and dominating tendencies that emulated being brainwashed. This combination of perceptions established a traumatic bond that the victim found incredibly difficult to break because rejecting the emotional connection as a whole would also involve rejecting the perks and benefits—the trips, the gifts, the treats, the confidante, and the caretaker.

Child grooming can be understood from a developmental perspective as well, and the relationship between the victim and the abuser evolves across the lifespan. Grooming starts when the child is extremely young—the trust of the child and the family is acquired. The child is given immense attention and is showered with gifts. As the individual matures and enters adolescence, the abuser becomes a confidante and a benefactor. In the case study mentioned previously, the abuser gave the victim career advice, picked him up, and dropped him off at school. Then, at the onset of adulthood, the abuser provided the victim with land to build their home and became the person the victim brought their partner home to. As the victim's developmental needs evolved, so did the abuser's response, such that the only thing constant was the victim's need for affection. In other words, the abuser was "able to capitalize on [the victim's] relational needs" until the victim was able to meet those needs in other ways.

==== Commercial sexual exploitation of children (CSEC) ====
The commercial sexual exploitation of children (CSEC) can cause debilitating physical and psychological trauma. Along with causing functional impairments, it can amplify risk-taking behaviors and increase impulse dysregulation, further compromising the child's ability to conceptualize, comprehend, establish, and maintain boundaries. This can lead to confusion regarding what safety, affection, intimacy, and kindness entail, resulting in the formation of a trauma bond with the abuser or trafficker that is based on skewed perceptions of safety and kindness. The trauma bond deepens and strengthens when isolation and threats to survival increase, forcing the victim to depend almost entirely on the abuser for survival and protection. This increased emotional dependence on the abuser normalizes the emotional violence experienced by the victim at the hands of the abuser, and gradually, the victim develops a sense of trust and safety, albeit skewed, towards the abuser.

==== Trauma-coercive bond ====
Trauma bonding thrives in the presence of a power imbalance and intermittent reward/punishment behavior. Trauma-coercive bonding, on the other hand, has two additional elements: social isolation and the perceived inability to escape the situation. Since these two elements are crucial to the experiences of victims of CSEC, their bonds with their abusers are better described as trauma-coercive bonds rather than simply as trauma bonds. The element of coercion concreted by social isolation and the perceived inability to escape makes the trauma bond more complex and far more deeply rooted. The use of coercive trauma bonding encapsulates the psycho-social dynamics of a relationship between a victim and a perpetrator of CSEC.

==== Intimate partner violence (IPV) ====
IPV has been defined as physical, sexual, psychological, economic, or stalking abuse, both concrete and menaced, perpetuated by current or ex-partners. Trauma bonding is used to solidify this type of relationship by rationalizing and/or minimizing a violent partner's behavior, self-blame, and reporting love in the context of fear.

=== Parent-child relationships ===
Trauma bonds in parent-child or caregiver-child dynamics can be borne from abuse, neglect, or incestuous relationships.

==== Abuse and/or neglect ====
Children of dismissive caregivers or cruel caregivers can develop insecure attachments, which can be very dysfunctional. Inconsistencies in reward and punishment (i.e., intermittent reinforcement of good and bad treatment) can highlight the affection the child receives from the parent, forcing a split between the abuse and the kindness such that the child seeks to form an overall positive view of the caregiver and thus focuses only on the affection and kindness they receive. Overall, a trauma bond develops such that the child's sense of self is derived from their emotional dependence on the authority figure, who, in this case, is the parent and/or caregiver.

==== Incest ====
Incestuous relationships between parents and children cultivate trauma bonds similar to those prevalent in victims of sex trafficking. All participants in a 1994 study by Jane Kay Hedberg on trauma in adult incest survivors demonstrated some trauma bonding with their abusers. There was a positive correlation between the pervasiveness of the trauma bond and the amount of contact the victim or the victim's close family members had with the abuser: those who self-reported less pervasive trauma also reported sustained contact with their abuser, while those who self-reported more pervasive trauma demonstrated an active avoidance of maintaining a relationship with their abuser. In incestuous parent-child dynamics, the study found that maintaining an unhealthy relationship with the abuser contributes to trauma and sustains the trauma bond. However, Hedberg cautions against generalizing findings from the study since the sample was small (n = 11) and wasn't representative of the general population of incest survivors. (Note: "Findings in this study could not be generalized to a population of incest survivors, because the sample is small and non-representative. Participants were gathered through word of mouth with no possibility for random sampling. In addition, there were no males in the study, although male victims certainly exist.")

This aligns with the idea that trauma bonds are toxic and difficult to leave due to the inherent power imbalance, which, in parent-child relationships, is even more pervasive than in other situations. Incestuous relationships also have an added layer of betrayal trauma, which arises from the exploitation of the victim's trust, resulting in a feeling of betrayal.

=== Military (tours of duty) ===
Trauma bonds can develop in military settings. The literature demonstrates this specifically in the context of tours of duty, wherein military personnel are deployed in hostile environments or areas of combat. A 2019 study exploring this specific phenomenon sought to understand the traumatic bond developed between Japanese soldiers and Korean 'comfort women' in the midst of World War II. The trauma, in this case, was two-fold: not only did the trauma bond develop in an abused-abuser dynamic, but the trauma itself was also a result of and was perpetuated by the war. While the relationships provided the Japanese soldiers with emotional relief and an escape from the violence of the war and the tyranny of the higher-ranking officers, they also provided the Korean 'comfort women' with much-desired protection and kindness from the soldiers.

Soldiers would behave aggressively and violently towards the 'comfort women' and often sexually exploit them. They would use intimidation tactics to assert dominance and foster coercion. However, this abuse would be interspersed with kindness and empathy from the soldiers, whose moods and subsequent behavior and interactions were highly contingent on the time and context of the ongoing war. Nonetheless, the intermittent kindness allowed the formation and maintenance of a trauma bond. Intermittent rewards were sometimes also more tangible, in the form of food, outings, and physical protection. However, protection and emotional support were pivotal in maintaining the trauma bonds and far more important than food and outings. The Korean 'comfort women' eventually came to be emotionally dependent on the Japanese soldiers and began to relate this dependence with their own sense of power, thereby establishing a trauma bond that, for some, persisted even after the war was over.

=== Preserving an abusive relationship ===
People who feel strong attached to someone or hurts them may try to protect that person and keep the relationship they have. They may do this because they feel scared of being left, ashamed, or afraid the abuse will become worse.

Common behaviors can include:

- Making up stories to cover up the actual cause of physical harm to protect the abuser from consequences
- Putting the blame on others like family, friends, or acquaintances that might try to get involved
- Downplaying the seriousness of abuse to others or to themselves
- Invalidating the situation by defending the person's character or saying the incident was "just an accident"

== Outcomes ==
Trauma bonding has several short-term and long-term impacts on the abused. It can force people to stay in abusive relationships, negatively affect self-image and self-esteem, perpetuate transgenerational cycles of abuse, and result in adverse mental health outcomes like an increased likelihood of developing depression and/or bipolar disorder.

=== Staying in abusive relationships ===
Owing to the debilitating psychological manipulation involved in the development of a trauma bond, abused people tend to stay in abusive relationships, mainly because the perceived consequences of leaving the relationship seem far more negative than the consequences of staying in the abusive relationship.

In such relationships, maltreatment is often interspersed with fragments of solace and peace that involve the expression of love, kindness, affection, and/or general friendliness from the abuser towards the abused. This intermittent reinforcement of a reward (here, the abuser's love and kindness) amidst all the abuse becomes what the victim begins to hold on to. Thus, victims tend to become emotionally dependent on the abuser and construct the belief that their survival is contingent upon receiving the abuser's love. Victims thereby begin to formulate their sense of identity (a form of self) around receiving the abuser's affection, which points to what could be gaslighting. Kindness and affection from the abuser amidst the abuse become a focal point for the victim's emotional dependence. This dependency is characterized by the belief that their survival is contingent on the abuser's love and affection, leading victims to construct their sense of identity and self-worth around this dynamic. Additionally, the provision of intermittent love and affection makes the victim cling to the hope that things can change. Furthermore, self-blame, the fear of social stigma and embarrassment, the fear of loneliness in the absence of a partner, and the lack of or poor social support from other family and friends also contribute to individuals remaining in abusive relationships.

=== Perpetuation of transgenerational cycles of abuse ===
People who have experienced trauma and traumatic bonds can, knowingly or unknowingly, repeat the cycle of abuse. In other words, victims who were traumatically bonded with abusers may grow to become abusers themselves. The abuse that victims inflict may or may not involve trauma bonding.

For instance, in a 2018 study on convicted child murderers, researchers found that caregivers who committed child homicide (murdered their child or care receiver) had experienced traumatic experiences and had trauma bonds with abusers in their early lives. Individuals with cruel and/or dismissive caregivers are likely to develop insecure attachments that result in a host of problems, including emotion deregulation and an attitude of confusion towards the caregiver, who becomes a source of comfort as well as fear. These adverse attachments can manifest in an individual's relationship with their own children as well. Attachment issues and painful memories of trauma bonds with their own caregivers can be triggered, and individuals may demonstrate heightened and disproportionate aggression toward their child, some culminating in homicide. In this study, participants experienced physical abuse, sexual abuse, a lack of protection from external dangers, abandonment, emotional rejection, and more from their caregivers. Nonetheless, participants expressed unconditional love towards their caregivers, justified by wanting to maintain an overall positive view of them. In their continued efforts to form an emotional connection, a trauma bond was fostered. These experiences had a severe negative impact on their relationship and bonding with their own children, contributing to "affectionless, unempathetic interpersonal behavior" that inflated aggressive and violent tendencies triggered by vulnerabilities.

=== Neurophysiological outcomes ===
The experience of being in a trauma bond can have adverse neurological and neurophysiological outcomes. The body of the victim of a trauma bond is in a perpetual 'fight-or-flight' response state, which can increase cortisol levels that can have a cascading effect and trigger other hormones.

Persistent, chronic stress can also hamper the cellular response in the body, thereby negatively impacting immunity, organ health, mood, energy levels, and more. In the long run, this can cause epigenetic changes as well. Furthermore, a study conducted in 2015 found that establishing a trauma bond in infancy is also linked with amygdala dysfunction, neurobehavioral deficits, and increased vulnerability to psychiatric disorders later on in life. Psychological abuse is correlated with sleep-related impairments. Disruption in sleep patterns leads to adverse neurophysiological problems, such as an increase in anxiety and irritability. For victims of psychological abuse, the increase in cortisol affects the brain in such a manner that it allows the trauma bonding to be strengthened.

=== Adverse mental health outcomes ===
Trauma bonding is linked to several adverse mental health and well-being outcomes. Due to the abuse and the emotional dependence on their abusers, victims tend to develop an incredibly negative self-image. "Controlling, restricting, degrading, isolating, or dominating" abuse has a crippling effect on the self-image and self-esteem of the abused, and this psychological abuse is far more dangerous than physical abuse. In a 2010 study on battered women labeling themselves as "stupid", researchers found that victims who felt like they allowed themselves to be mistreated and victims who stayed in abusive relationships labeled themselves as "stupid" for doing so. This further contributes to a negative self-image and the maintenance of low self-esteem, both of which foster a poor self-concept, which, in turn, adversely impacts mental well-being. The same was observed in the case study mentioned previously on grooming.

Trauma bonding can also lead to dissociative symptoms that could be a self-preservation and/or coping mechanism. Neurobiological changes can also affect brain development and hamper learning. The internalization of psychological manipulation and trauma can cause anxiety and increase the likelihood of engaging in risk-taking behaviors. Furthermore, the isolation involved in trauma bonding can foster a generally skewed sense of trust, making victims vulnerable to situations that may retraumatize or revictimize them. Victims may also tend to either completely dismiss or minimize dangerous, damaging behaviors and violence around them.

Trauma bonds in parent-child relationships (wherein the child is the victim and the parent is the abuser) can also lead to depressive symptoms later in life. In a 2017 study exploring this, it was found that an "affectionless control" parenting style, characterized by high protection and low care from parents, was a major predictor of depressive symptomology for the victim. In other words, the presence of poor parental bonding coupled with childhood trauma bonds increased the likelihood of the child developing depressive symptoms in the future. A negative self-image is formed when feelings of inadequacy and hopelessness persist and are reinforced by caregivers. Perpetual efforts to seek secure emotional attachments reap no rewards, and a trauma bond facilitates a negative core schema that influences perceptions and interactions throughout one's life. This can give rise to mental health issues such as depression, bipolar disorder, mania, suicidality, and substance abuse that can be pervasive and lifelong.

== See also ==
- Attachment theory
- Betrayal trauma
- Breadcrumbing
- Child sexual abuse
- Domestic violence
- Fatal attraction (sociology)
- Gaslighting
- Human bonding
- Love addiction
- On-again, off-again relationship
- Psychological trauma
- Stockholm syndrome
