= On-again, off-again relationship =

Type of interpersonal relationship

An on-again, off-again relationship (also known as an on-and-off relationship or simply on-off relationship) is a form of interpersonal relationship between two people whose breakups are followed by reconciliation, perpetuating a cycle. Relationship reconciliation is defined as the process in which partners attempt to heal the hurt or wrong that was done and move on from it to progress forward in the relationship. This process of breaking up and getting back together can be short- or long-term.

These relationships differ from non-cyclical relationships in that on-again, off-again relationships are between partners that have pre-existing knowledge and experiences with each other. In addition to this, on-and-off partners often report more relationship uncertainty, questioning the meaning of the relationship, its strength, and future. Despite this, a 2009 study published in the Personal Relationships Journal revealed that nearly two-thirds of participants have experienced being in an on-again, off-again relationship.

According to Professor Rene Dailey at the University of Texas at Austin, there are no specific relationship dispositions that make someone more or less likely to be in an on-again, off-again relationship. Dailey defines relationship disposition to be the way that individuals approach their relationship in regards to its purpose and functioning. This includes attachment style, destiny and growth beliefs, and communal orientation. In her 2020 study of on-and-off and non-cyclical partners, results did not show on-and-off partners to be more avoidant, believe in destiny more strongly, or have less communal orientation than the non-cyclical couples.

== Causes ==
A 2011 study published in the Journal of Social Psychology revealed that lingering feelings and continued attachment were the most common reasons why partners decided to get back together. Furthermore, reconciliation often was initiated by one person. While the other partner may not have strongly wanted to get back together, familiarity with the relationship may have led to the decision to get back together. Other common causes for renewal of these relationships include changing perceptions, dissatisfaction with alternative partners, missing companionship, sympathy for the partner, and investment.

Those who experienced on-and-off patterns also tended to show strong beliefs in that love overcomes all obstacles and that there is only one true partner for that person. In "Relationship Churning in Emerging Adulthood: On/Off Relationships and Sex with an Ex," the authors note that individuals going through this process often look to the positive qualities of the relationship to guide their decisions.

Some research also suggests that breaking up can happen more frequently when it used as a tactic to attain what an individual wants, and thus, it creates an unhealthy cycle of conflict followed by ending the relationship and getting back together.

== Impact ==
=== Potential drawbacks and risks ===
On-and-off partners report experiencing more negative aspects of the relationship in comparison to non-cyclical partners. These relationships are often strained by doubt, disappointment, and emotional frustration. Thus, being in an on-again, off-again relationship can damage one's mental health. Researcher Kale Monk, an assistant professor of human development and family sciences at the University of Missouri, discusses how these types of relationships can have higher rates of abuse, poorer communication, and lower levels of commitment.

In a 2013 study analyzing relationship churning in relation to physical violence and verbal abuse, researchers found that relationships with on-and-off patterns are twice as likely as couples who stably broke up or are together to report physical violence and half as likely to report verbal abuse. This may arise from the instability that comes with many on-and-off relationships, as there may be a tendency for quicker escalation and poor communication and relationship skills.

Furthermore, on-and-off relationships pose risks in the healing process. Research has shown more difficulty in partners moving on by continuing this cycle, especially if partners have sex during periods of technically not being together. Partners's feelings of pain may also intensify with such emotionally-taxing events. On the other hand, on-and-off patterns can potentially normalize relationship disruptions and reconciliations for future relationships. Because of this, breakups may not have the same impact as they once did.

=== Potential benefits ===
Despite this, not all on-again, off-again relationships are considered toxic, as breaking up and reconciling can help a couple with better communication and address the issues in their relationships. On-and-off partners have reported “future relationship knowledge" as being the top benefit of these types of relationships. Other benefits include new perspectives, improving the current relationship, and learning more about yourself.

== Emerging adulthood ==
This cyclical nature of relationships has proven to be a common part of emerging adulthood of many. From a developmental perspective, this is in some ways expected, as it is a part of exploration in young adulthood. Individuals attempt to learn what they want in future relationships and long-term partners, and in doing so, this time period can be tumultuous, as they are building up experience in relationships.

In a 2013 study analyzing relationship instability published in the Journal of Adolescent Research, researchers reported that half of the young adults in the sample reported reconciliation from their current or most recent relationship. Dating and cohabiting couples in emerging adulthood showed higher frequency in reconciliation than in married couples, in part, due to less commitment, less investment, and simply the nature of the relationship. Less committed couples may breakup in less extreme circumstances, and thus, reconciliations are more likely to occur.

== See also ==
- Breadcrumbing
- Fatal attraction (sociology)
- Fear of commitment
- Investment model of commitment
- Romeo and Juliet effect
- Traumatic bonding
