= Freyd =

Freyd is a surname. Notable people with this surname include:

- Jennifer Freyd (born 1957), an American psychology academic
- Peter J. Freyd (born 1936), an American mathematician
- Pamela Freyd, who cofounded the False Memory Syndrome Foundation in 1992
