= Star-crossed =

Pair of lovers thwarted by outside forces

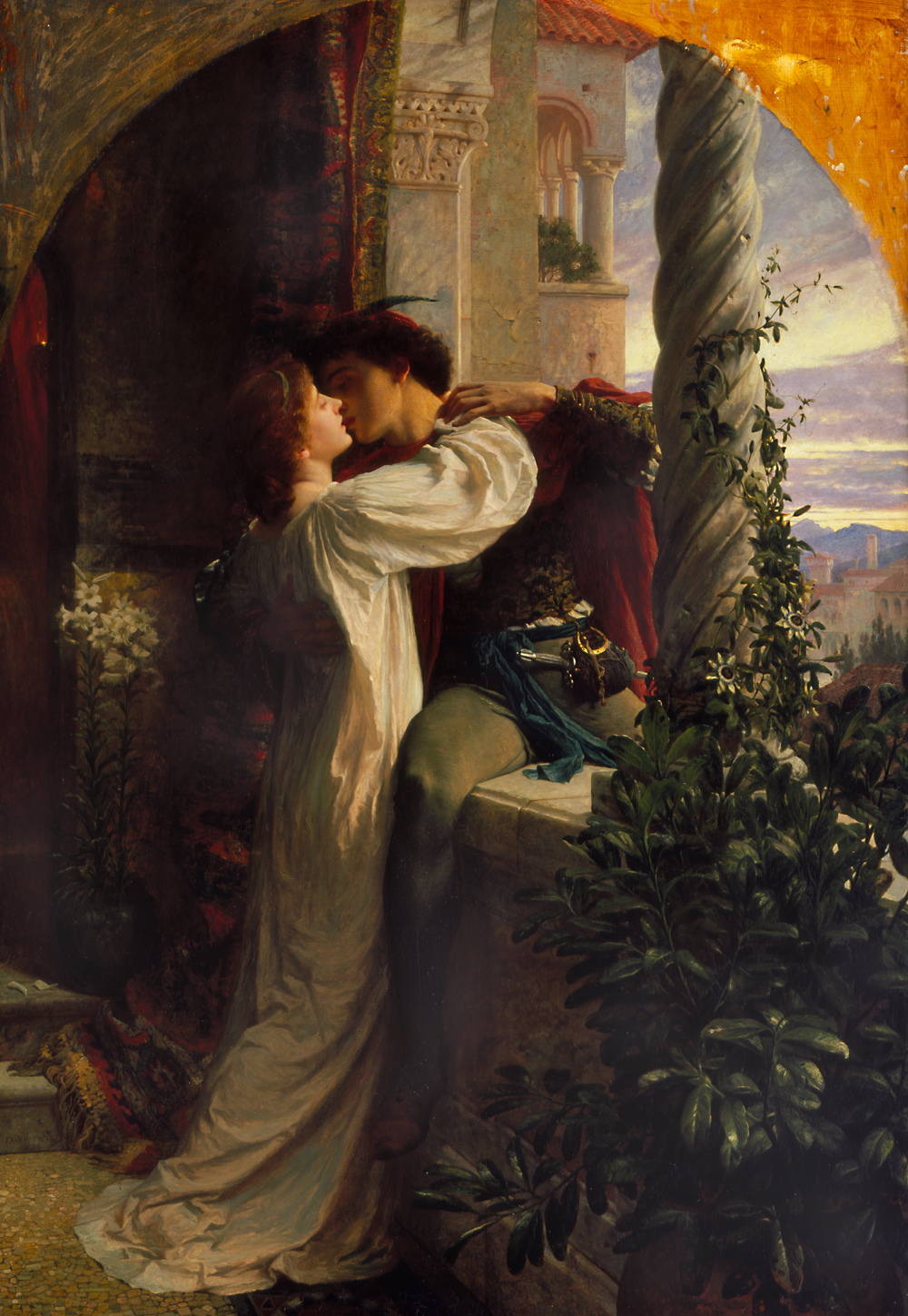
The phrase "star-crossed lovers" was coined in Shakespeare's Romeo and Juliet.

The terms "star-crossed" and "star-crossed lovers" refer to two people who are not able to be together for some reason. These terms also have other meanings, but originally mean that the pairing is being "thwarted by a malign star" or that the stars are working against the relationship. The phrase stems from the astrological belief that the positions of the stars ruled over people's fates, and is best known from the play Romeo and Juliet by the Elizabethan playwright William Shakespeare. Such pairings are often said to be doomed from the start.

== Definitions ==
The phrase was coined in the prologue of Shakespeare's Romeo and Juliet:

From forth the fatal loins of these two foes,
A pair of star-cross'd lovers take their life (5–6).

It also refers to destiny and the inevitability of the two characters' paths crossing. It usually but not always refers to unlucky outcomes, since Romeo and Juliet's affair ended tragically. Further, it connotes that the lovers entered into their union without sufficient forethought or preparation; That the lovers may not have had adequate knowledge of each other or that they were not thinking rationally.

(The original texts of the prologue, Q1 and Q2, use the spelling "starre-crost", but the version "star-cross'd" is normally used in modern versions.)

== Classical examples ==
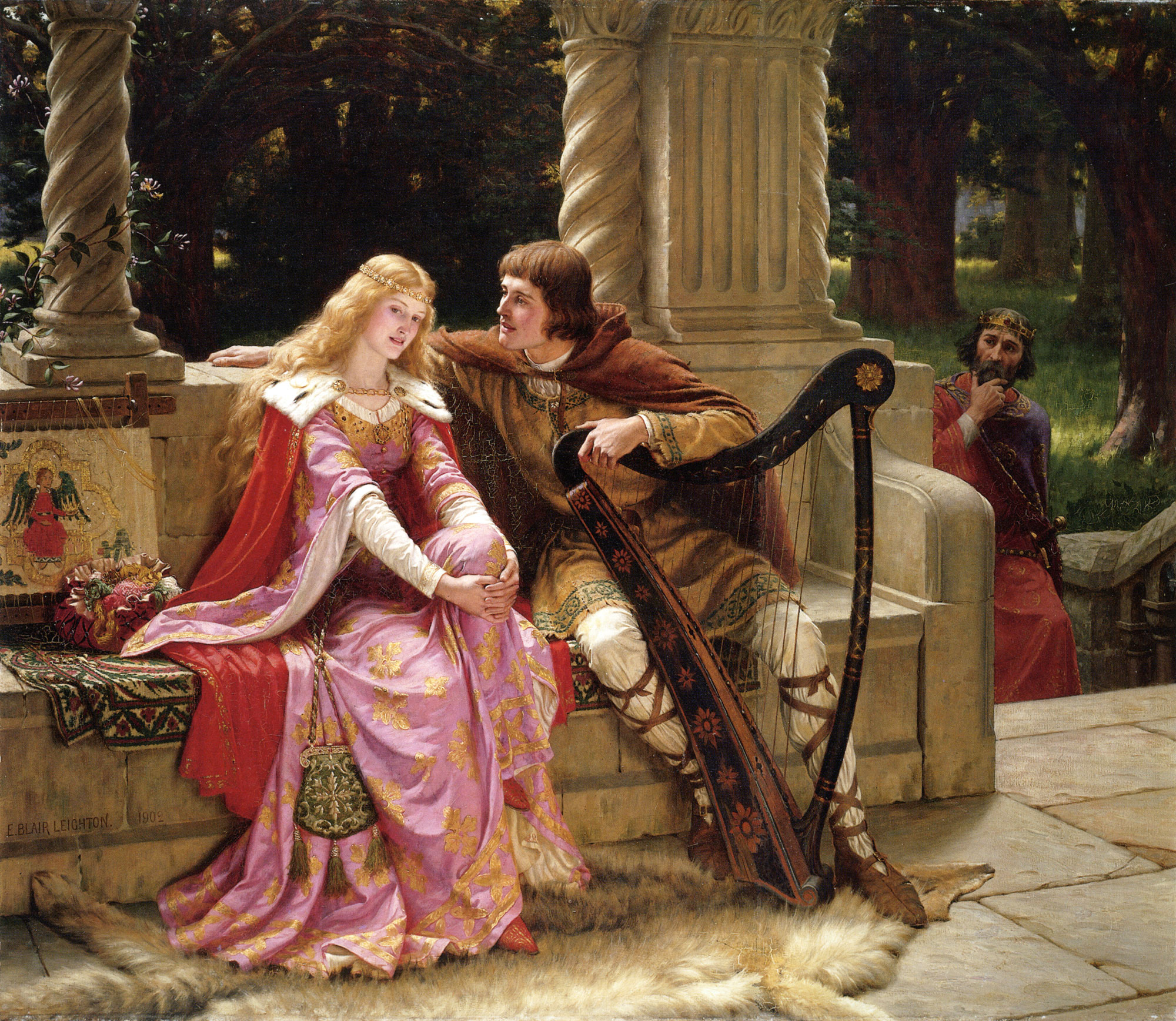
Tristan and Isolde

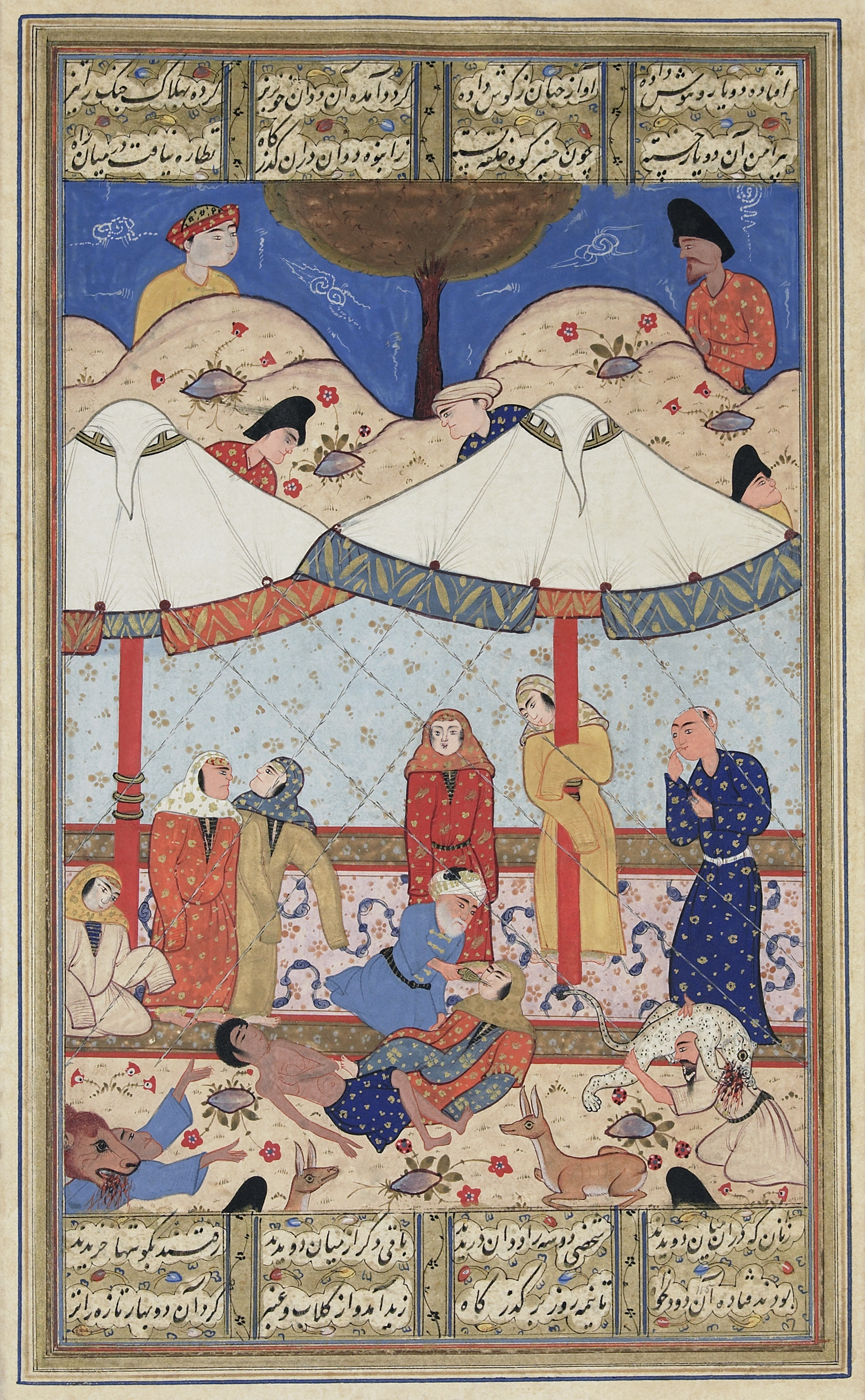
Layla and Majnun

Examples of famous star-crossed lovers vary in written work. Pyramus and Thisbe are usually regarded as the source for Romeo and Juliet, and is featured in A Midsummer Night's Dream. Wuthering Heights, considered to be one of the greatest love stories in literary works, is a tale of all-encompassing and passionate, yet thwarted, love between the star-crossed Catherine Earnshaw and Heathcliff, and how this unresolved passion eventually destroys them and many around them.

In Virgil's Aeneid, the Trojan exile prince Aeneas and Dido, queen of Carthage, fall passionately in love – but the gods order Aeneas away to Italy and the spurned Dido commits suicide. Of course, Virgil's readers in Rome in the first century BC would know in advance that this love was doomed, since Aeneas's and Dido's progeny – respectively the Romans and the Carthaginians – would eventually become mortal enemies.

Lancelot, a trusted knight of King Arthur's Round Table, and Guinevere, the queen of Camelot and wife of Arthur, were involved in a star-crossed affair. In some versions of the tale, she is instantly smitten, and when they consummate their adulterous passion, it is an act which paves the way for the fall of Camelot and Arthur's death.

The legend of Tristan and Iseult (also known as Tristan and Isolde) is an influential romance and tragedy, retold in numerous sources with as many variations. The tragic story is of the adulterous love between the lovers. The narrative predates and most likely influenced the Arthurian romance of Lancelot and Guinevere, and has had a substantial impact on Western art and literature since it first appeared in the 12th century. While the details of the story differ from one author to another, the overall plot structure remains much the same.

Pedro of Portugal and Inês de Castro shared a true and tragic love in the Portuguese 14th century. The dramatic circumstances of their relationship, forbidden by Peter's father, King Afonso IV, Inês' murder at the orders of Afonso, Peter's bloody revenge on her killers and the legend of the coronation of her exhumed corpse by Peter, have turned their story into a frequent subject of art, music, and drama through the ages.

Hero and Leander is a Greek myth, relating the story of Hero (Greek: Ἡρώ), a priestess of Aphrodite who dwelt in a tower in Sestos, at the edge of the Hellespont, and Leander (Greek: Λέανδρος, Leandros), a young man from Abydos on the other side of the strait. Leander fell in love with Hero and would swim every night across the Hellespont to be with her. Hero would light a lamp at the top of her tower to guide his way.

Pelléas and Mélisande (French: Pelléas et Mélisande) is a Symbolist play by Maurice Maeterlinck about the forbidden, doomed love of the title characters. A classical myth, was a common subject for art during the Renaissance and Baroque eras.

Troilus and Cressida is a tragedy by Shakespeare, believed to have been written in 1602. The play (also described as one of Shakespeare's problem plays) is not a conventional tragedy, since its protagonist (Troilus) does not die. The play ends instead on a very bleak note with the death of the noble Trojan Hector and destruction of the love between Troilus and Cressida.

Venus and Adonis is a classical myth during the Renaissance.

Heer Ranjha is one of the four popular tragic romances of the Punjab.

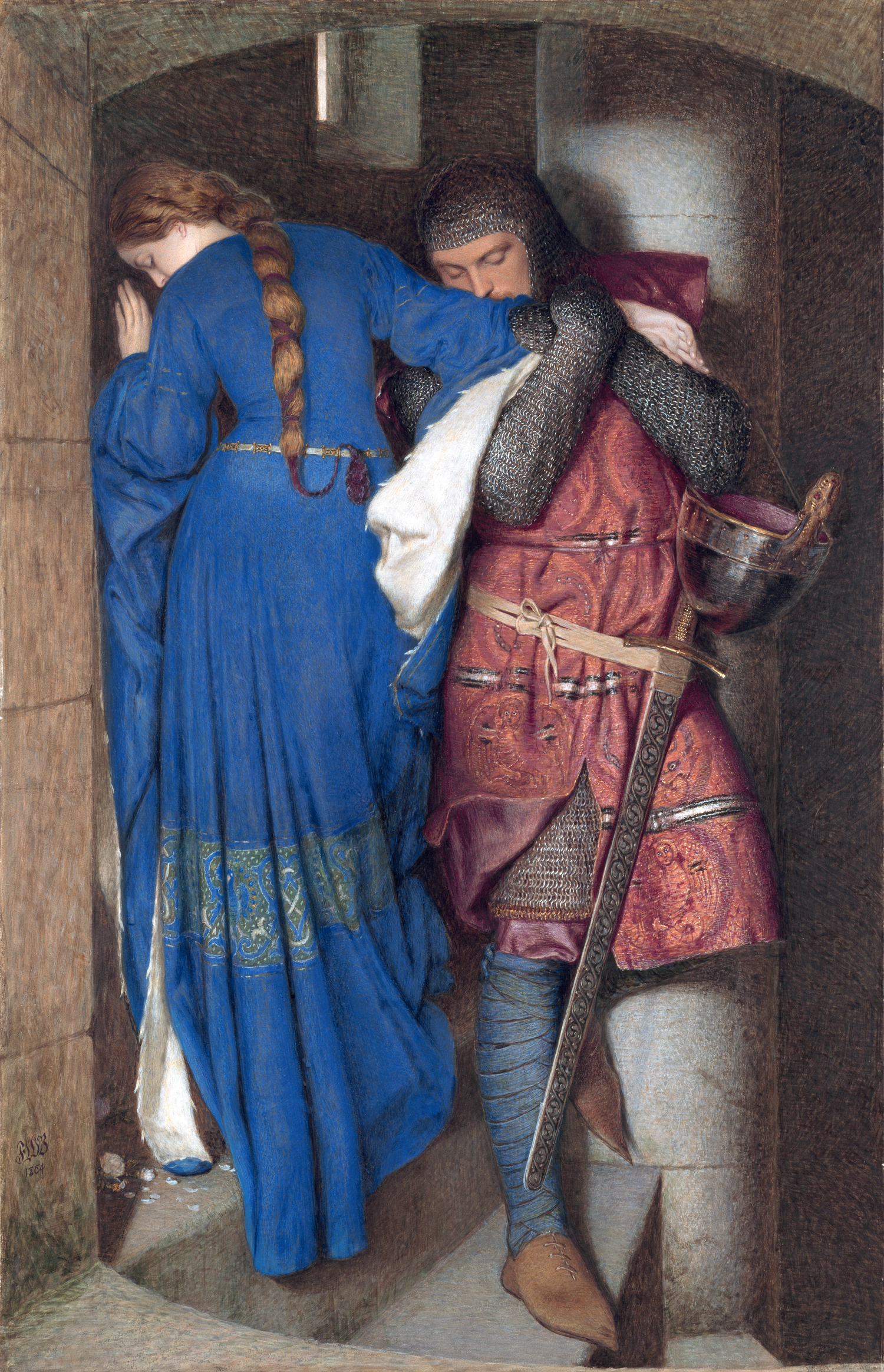
Hellelil and Hildebrand

Popocatépetl and Iztaccíhuatl refers to a number of mythical and folkloric explanations of the origins of the volcanoes Popocatépetl ("the Smoking Mountain") and Iztaccíhuatl ("white woman" in Nahuatl, sometimes called the Mujer Dormida "sleeping woman" in Spanish) which overlook the Valley of Mexico.

Layla and Majnun (by the Persian poet Nizami Ganjavi) is a classical Arabian love story. It is based on the real story of a young man called Qays ibn al-Mulawwah from the Arabian Peninsula, in the Umayyad era during the 7th century. There were two Arabic versions of the story at the time. In one version, he spent his youth together with Layla, tending their flocks. In the other version, upon seeing Layla he fell passionately in love with her. In both versions, however, he went mad when her father prevented him from marrying her; for that reason he came to be called Majnun Layla, which means "Driven mad by Layla". To him were attributed a variety of incredibly passionate romantic Arabic poems, considered among the foremost examples of the Udhari school.

The Butterfly Lovers is a Chinese legend about the tragic romance between two lovers, Liang Shanbo and Zhu Yingtai. The legend is sometimes regarded as the Chinese equivalent to Romeo and Juliet.

Other classic star-crossed lovers include Devdas and Paro (Parvati) in Devdas, Paris of Troy and Helen of Sparta in The Iliad, Oedipus and Jocasta in Oedipus Rex, Mark Antony and Cleopatra during the time of the Roman Empire, Khosrow and Shirin during the time of Sassanid Persia, Heloise and Peter Abelard during the Middle Ages, and Emperor Jahangir and Anarkali, Cyrano and Roxane in Cyrano de Bergerac, Hagbard and Signy, and Maratha Peshwa (Prime Minister) Bajirao and Mastani during the peak of Maratha Empire.

== Modern examples ==
Prime time television has had various star-crossed lovers labeled as notable and "unforgettable" love stories. IGN considers Buffy Summers and Angel from Buffy the Vampire Slayer to be one of the genre's most tragic and notable star-crossed pairings. The Doctor bidding farewell to his companion Rose Tyler in Doctor Who has been named one of the greatest love scenes in science fiction. Cole Turner and Phoebe Halliwell from Charmed, Michael and Nikita from La Femme Nikita, Kara Thrace and Lee Adama from Battlestar Galactica, Clark Kent and Lana Lang from Smallville, as well as Lucas Scott and Peyton Sawyer from One Tree Hill are other notable star-crossed couples from the genre. Commander Lexa and Clarke Griffin from the TV series The 100 are also considered star-crossed lovers, as well as Nancy and Ace in Nancy Drew.

With film or within modern novels and books, such star-crossed couples as Jack Dawson and Rose DeWitt Bukater from Titanic, Landon Carter and Jamie Sullivan from "A Walk to Remember", Anakin Skywalker and Padmé Amidala and Kylo Ren and Rey from the Star Wars saga, Ennis Del Mar and Jack Twist from Brokeback Mountain, Jake and Neytiri from Avatar, and Arthur Fleck and Harley "Lee" Quinzel from Joker: Folie à Deux have been included.

In soap opera, modern examples of star-crossed lovers have included couples such as Cliff Warner and Nina Cortlandt, JR Chandler and Babe Carey and Bianca Montgomery and Maggie Stone from All My Children. In 2008, a web-based reality soap opera was created based on the concept of being star-crossed. In Starcrossed, Fox News astrologer Greg Tufaro takes a couple in crisis and separates them for one cycle of the moon. Each is then set up with individuals who are a better match astrologically. The show puts the question "Is love written in the stars?" to the test with the couple deciding on the 28th day of their separation whether they will stay together or remain apart.

In comics, the decision of Marvel Comics to kill off Gwen Stacy, the girlfriend and first great love of Peter Parker, made the two of them into star-crossed lovers, although that was not the original intention. Their relationship was strained by Peter's responsibilities as Spider-Man, as well as Gwen's resentment of his frequent absences and apparent evasiveness. Her death became one of the most impactful tragedies in Spider-Man's history. Peter's following relationship with and marriage to Mary Jane Watson also developed into one of Marvel Comics' most enduring romantic storylines. Their marriage was erased from mainstream continuity in the controversial One More Day (2007), in which they made a supernatural bargain with Mephisto to save Peter's dying aunt, May Parker. Alternate continuities, including The Amazing Spider-Man: Renew Your Vows and the relaunched Ultimate Spider-Man, have depicted Peter and Mary Jane remaining married and raising children together.

Video games too have featured star-crossed couples across different genres, particularly role-playing video games: Cloud Strife and Aerith Gainsborough from Final Fantasy VII have been cited as a well-known star-crossed love story. Tidus and Yuna from Final Fantasy X have been called star-crossed lovers. Zero and Iris from Mega Man X4 are another notable example.

In animated television, some series could also be classified as star-crossed lovers. For example:

- Jaune Arc and Pyrrha Nikos from the animated web-series RWBY. Pyrrha's sense of duty and belief in her destiny resulted in her sacrificing her life after confessing her love to Jaune.
- Eren Yeager and Mikasa Ackerman from dark fantasy anime television series Attack on Titan. Eren and Mikasa's complicated relationship is defined by unwavering loyalty (rooted in a childhood trauma), a defining red scarf, and a forced, inevitable separation where Mikasa must kill Eren to save humanity.
- Pearl and Rose Quartz from the Cartoon Network series Steven Universe. Pearl secretly had a romantic relationship with Rose for centuries until a human named Greg Universe came into a relationship with Rose and conceived their child, Steven Universe, sacrificing her life as a gem for Steven's sake. Pearl, however, is unable to cope with her grief over the loss of Rose, which causes her relationship with Greg to be strained until the 8th episode of the 3rd season, "Mr. Greg".

== See also ==
- Elopement
- List of idioms attributed to Shakespeare
- Romeo and Juliet effect
- Soulmate
- Teenage tragedy song
- Unrequited love
