= Donna Jones =

Donna Jones may refer to:

- Donna Jones (American politician), Idaho state controller
- Murder of Donna Jones, Canadian murder victim
- Donna Jones (singer), British performing artist with The New Seekers, known as Pussyfoot in the 1970s
- Donna Jones (British politician), British politician; Police and Crime Commissioner for Hampshire and the Isle of Wight (2021-)
- 22855 Donnajones, an asteroid named for Arizona teacher Donna Jones
