= The Feel of Algorithms =

2023 book by Minna Ruckenstein

- Author: Minna Ruckenstein
- Language: English
- Subject: Algorithm studies
- Genre: Non-fiction
- Publisher: University of California Press
- Publication date: May 2023
- Pages: 240
- ISBN: 9780520394551

The Feel of Algorithms is a 2023 book by Minna Ruckenstein. (Note: a professor of Emerging Technologies in Society at the Consumer Society Research Centre, University of Helsinki) The book studies the emotional experiences and everyday interactions people have with algorithms. Ruckenstein combines first-person accounts with interdisciplinary research to examine how feelings such as excitement, fear, and frustration shape understandings of algorithms and their social and behavioral impact.

== Synopsis ==
Ruckenstein examines the cultural, social, and emotional dimensions of algorithmic systems. She tracks their pervasive influence on contemporary life, and focuses on everyday experiences and emotional responses. The book presents algorithms as agents that shape, and are shaped by, human behavior. Drawing on interviews and empirical research conducted in Finland, it explains the global implications of algorithmic systems all while situating them within specific local contexts.

The narrative uses the concept of "structures of feeling," adapted from Raymond Williams, to explore three distinct emotional frameworks associated with algorithmic culture: the dominant, oppositional, and emerging structures. The dominant structure emphasizes the pleasurable and empowering aspects of algorithms, often promoted by technological professionals. The oppositional structure reflects fears and frustrations tied to privacy concerns, surveillance, and informational asymmetries. The emerging structure reveals a blend of positive and negative experiences, illustrating the ambivalence in navigating algorithmic interactions and fostering adaptation.

Ruckenstein situates algorithms within "infrastructures of intimacy," where they influence preferences, decisions, and relationships. She underscores tensions between individual agency and systemic forces, discussing inequalities and everyday understandings of data colonialism while advocating for more equitable and ethical algorithmic practices. The book calls for critical engagement with these systems, emphasizing care and ethical responsibility in their development, while pushing for humane approaches to their design.

== Reviews ==
Ai Hisano, of the University of Tokyo, highlighted the book's use of Raymond Williams' concept of "structures of feeling" to categorize societal responses to algorithms into three types: dominant (pleasurable), oppositional (fear and distrust), and emerging (irritation and ambivalence). Hisano noted the book's integration of diverse theoretical frameworks, including affect and emotion studies, media studies, and anthropology, which provide a nuanced understanding of algorithmic culture. However, she critiqued the lack of clarity regarding the historical and social contexts that shape these structures of feeling, questioning when and how the dominant and emerging structures became prominent. Hisano also suggested that the emerging structure might be better understood as a liminal, ever-present potential within algorithmic culture rather than a new development. She found the book ambitious and insightful but called for further exploration of the contextual dynamics influencing algorithmic culture.

Katalin Feher, in her review, praised Ruckenstein for her multidisciplinary exploration of the emotional and experiential dimensions of algorithmic culture. Feher underscored the book's emphasis on the interplay between technology and emotions, and she noted its unique contribution to understanding algorithmic systems as both cultural and intimate forces. However, Feher critiqued the book for its reliance on elite perspectives and U.S.-centric examples, which she argued limited its inclusivity and broader applicability. Despite these critiques, Feher acknowledged the book's value in offering a human-centered approach to technology.

David Beer from University of York considered Ruckenstein’s work as "careful scholarship" that dissected algorithmic culture through the lens of lived experience. Ruckenstein’s analysis, he noted, centered on interview-derived narratives to map what she termed "structures of feeling"—a conceptual framework borrowed from Raymond Williams—to trace how individuals articulated their encounters with algorithmic systems. Beer emphasized the book’s methodological "strategic ambivalence," which rejected simplistic moral judgments, instead positioning algorithms as sites of "friction" that intertwined harm and possibility. Through concepts like "care," "irritation," and human-machine "feedback loops," Ruckenstein illuminated the relational tensions shaping algorithmic interactions, resisting deterministic conclusions. While the book intentionally avoided prescribing fixed futures, Beer argued this indeterminacy was its strength: by sustaining openness, it invited collaborative, ethically attuned research to reimagine life within algorithmic culture. He situated the work within a growing scholarly effort to normalize algorithms as mundane yet potent social actors, praising its dual focus on grounded present-day critiques and speculative, care-driven futures.

In a 2025 review essay in the Journal of Communication, Taina Bucher discusses The Feel of Algorithms as a significant contribution to understanding the cultural and affective dimensions of algorithmic systems. The review emphasizes the book's relevance in relation to the latest AI developments, as it challenges the dominant focus on rationality in AI discourse. Bucher praises Ruckenstein's distinction between mere emotional reactions to algorithms and the deeper, intuitive 'feel' of these systems that people develop. The review notes Ruckenstein's application of concepts like 'structures of feeling' and 'friction' to analyze these encounters.
