= The Iron Tooth =

Fantasy novel by Prithvin Rajendran

- First edition
- Author: Prithvin Rajendran
- Language: English
- Genre: Fantasy
- Published: 2011 Frog Books/ Leadstart Publishing
- Publication place: India
- Media type: Print (Paperback)
- Pages: 224 pp (Paperback edition)
- ISBN: 978-93-8111-525-1 (Paperback edition)

The Iron Tooth is a fantasy novel written by Prithvin Rajendran, an author based in Chennai. The novel has been published by Frog Books Mumbai. an imprint of Leadstart Publishing,

The Iron Tooth is along the lines of an epic, with themes of good defeating evil, treachery, fantasy and romance. The author, Rajendran, was targeting a global audience with the novel.

== Synopsis ==
In the continent of Goodabaiya, the kingdom of Dashter prospers under the rule of King Dashtum. Dashtum is famous for his scrimmage with the Minotaur Trak. Due to a dreaded disease, Dashtum bids farewell to this world and is succeeded by his wicked son, Darum.

Princess Nova, King Darum’s first child, is beautiful but proud. During a ball, Princess Nova insults Emperor Faerum, ruler of the kingdom of Fallix. Faerum seethes with anger and proclaims that he will have his revenge. Emperor Faerum is a powerful wizard, who in addition to the kingdom of Fallix has dominion over the vampires and Gorgons. Faerum possesses a large Bak army headed by General Bathaki. Along with six foreign wizards, Faerum forges an alliance called "The Trust of Seven".

The Trust of Seven seeks to destroy the kingdom of Dashter and manages to convince the Custodian of First Light, an immortal having the power to bring light to the continent of Goodabaiya, to curse Dashter. The Custodian of First Light curses the kingdom of Greatix, hangs King Darum, and imprisons Princess Nova in a Keep. From that moment, light did not dare enter the kingdom of Dashter.

In the town of Ballos in Greatix, three brothers: Pancrix, Denzix, and Princix live with their mother, Ushix. The father had abandoned them when Princix was still a baby and had never returned. The three brothers decide to seek their fortune and set out through the Mysterious Land of Zhakse. After managing to subdue a panzeox and a giant, Pancrix and Denzix return home with rubies, sapphires and golden pomegranates. Princix continues his journey. He gets two magical sticks, an armour plate and helmet, a mace and a glove.

In the kingdom of Greatix, a Champion General competition is announced. Princix wins the competition with the aid of his magical gifts. King Grantum commands Princix and two of soldiers, Hammil and Candelbre, to investigate the rumours of the curse of the kingdom of Dashter. The trio plan to reach the kingdom of Dashter by travelling through the Land of Mogrash, the country of Sumrak, and the Land of Rakhfar. Princix's real battle begins as he faces creatures of the air, giants of the land, and monsters of the sea.

There is a war with Gorgons, vampires, battle rams, trebuchets, catapults, Vagarols - new creatures, Baks and so on.

== Main characters ==
The main characters of the novel are:

- Bathaki: The general of Faerum's Bak army. A seasoned campaigner who crushed the rebellion of the Vampires and Medusas. He is an odd-looking character, who is very repulsive to look at.
- Candelbre: One of Greatix’s Imperial Guard of Bodyguards, who is an ace with the bow. Candelbre aids Princix and Hammil as they go to solve the mystery of the cursed kingdom of Dashter.
- Custodian of First Light: The Custodian is an immortal, who has power to bring light into the continent of Goodabaiya. The Custodian existed before the world was made and he saw the sun, moon and other creatures in its infancy.
- Darum: The cruel king of Dashter, who was the cause of the downfall of the kingdom of Dashter. Corruption, bribery and other illegal activities thrived during his rule.
- Duke: Leader of the Thieves
- Elnix: Legal General of the kingdom of Dashter
- Faerum: The evil Emperor of the kingdom of Fallix, the Land of Vampires, and the Medusas Land. He suppressed the Vampires and Medusas and brought them under his control. He becomes even more ambitious and tries to bring the continent of Goodabaiya under his control.
- Grantum: The wise and sensible king of Greatix who has a soft corner for his people. He is aided by his Imperial Guard while the administration is in the safe hands of his Champion General, Princix.
- Hammil: Member of Greatix’s Imperial Guard of Bodyguards
- Nova: Princess of the kingdom of Dashter
- Princix: The protagonist who becomes the Champion General of Greatix against all odds. He journeys with Hammil and Candelbre to investigate the mystery behind the cursed kingdom of Dashter and on the way he faces creatures of the air, giants of the land and monsters of the sea.
- Trust of Seven: An Alliance formed between seven powerful wizards: Philipisa, Henroya, Ranfus, Schujake, Vajarka, Rekakov and Faerum.
- Ushix: The mother of Enwixx, Lasixx, and Princix.
