= Fatal attraction (sociology) =

When qualities leading to attraction lead to breakup

In interpersonal relationships a fatal attraction is when the very qualities that draw one to someone eventually contribute to relational breakup.

== Fatal attraction framework ==
Fatal attraction research began as exploratory research attempting to connect characteristics of initial attractiveness with those later perceived as problematic. Prior to this research, there had been extensive research on attraction and relationship dissolution. However, this research was innovative in trying to correlate the same characteristics to both initial attraction and relationship breakup. In her landmark research on fatal attraction Diane Felmlee analyzed the data from a random sample on initial attraction and the subsequent data from a self-report study of the sample respondents' about the characteristics they dislike about their partner. Felmlee then summarized her results in terms of pertinence to interpersonal theories and dialectical perspectives.

Felmlee is the major contributor in fatal attraction framework. As of September 2024, Felmlee is a professor of sociology at Penn State University. When she wrote her major work on fatal attraction she was a professor at the University of California, Davis. David Orzechowicz and Carmen Fortes are also contributors to fatal attraction framework.

== Theoretical conclusions ==
One conclusion resulting from Felmlee's research was that differences were the most common type of fatal attraction. Therefore, the differences in partners that were initially attractive were not in the long run. Another conclusion was that other perceived opposite qualities such as being fun and exciting can eventually be the cause for breakup if one is fun or exciting to an extreme. Finally, it seems that being attracted to a narcissistic person is also a common type of fatal attraction.

== Narcissism ==
Narcissism is defined as the inordinate fascination with oneself, excessive self-love, or vanity. Being attracted to a narcissistic person is another common occurrence of fatal attraction. Narcissistic individuals are described as attractive in the beginning because they are perceived as confident, charming and entertaining. Narcissists are, in part, viewed this way in the beginning because they are making the effort to be seen in this light. As described with the other personality traits in fatal attraction, over time the same confidence and charm once associated with the narcissistic person are later described as arrogance and manipulation.

== See also ==
- Breadcrumbing
- Limerence
- Love addiction
- Obsessive love
- On-again, off-again relationship
- Romeo and Juliet effect
- Traumatic bonding
