= Institutional betrayal =

Abuse of its dependents by an institution

Institutional betrayal is a concept described by psychologist Jennifer Freyd, referring to "wrongdoings perpetrated by an institution upon individuals dependent on that institution, including failure to prevent or respond supportively to wrongdoings by individuals (e.g. sexual assault) committed within the context of the institution". It is an extension of betrayal trauma theory. When institutions such as universities cover up violations such as rape, sexual assault and child sexual abuse (as in the Penn State child sex abuse scandal), this institutional betrayal undermines survivors' recovery. In a landmark study in 2013, Carly P. Smith and Freyd documented psychological harm caused by institutional betrayal. A legal analysis concludes that this study is reliable under the Frye standard and the Daubert standard.

The term received increased attention based on White House statements in 2014 about sexual assault on college campuses. The term is also used by the Harvard University student group Our Harvard Can Do Better. Recent debate about how colleges respond to sexual assault by students has brought this issue renewed media attention. Many students who have been sexually assaulted in college have taken to Instagram to provide anonymous accounts of their assault and the college's response. Although sharing accounts of trauma can be helpful in reducing a sense of aloneness, reinforcement via social media may cause an increase in reported PTSD symptoms linked to institutional betrayal.

Institutional betrayal can occur within families, governments and the military, organizations, workplaces, religious institutions, or any organizational system in which people are dependent on systemic protection. Individuals who have experienced extensive trauma appear to be both less satisfied with police responses in the face of an intimate partner violence incident and more distrustful of police. Therefore, these individuals may experience feelings of institutional betrayal due to a perceived failure of the police to prevent further revictimization. Individuals who have been frequently retraumatized are also the ones most likely to utilize health care and mental health services. Institutional betrayal in the medical system is currently being investigated in the Canadian health care system. It is hypothesized that institutional betrayal in the medical system will explain symptoms of PTSD, depression and anxiety above and beyond the effects of general tendencies to trust others or the patient satisfaction with the care received.

== In academia ==
The experience of betrayal from academic institutions is one of the primary focuses of research on institutional betrayal due in part to political statements and student advocacy and outcry regarding college campus sexual assault around the United States. Along with universities and college campuses, institutional betrayal has been experienced by high school students as well. High school students were shown to express feelings of institutional betrayal correlated with gender-based harassment during school. Additionally, students in high school and university settings have indicated feeling betrayed by their academic institutions due to mishandling cases of bullying due to sexual or gender identity. Beyond issues of institutional betrayal due to omission or commission in systemic, intersectional factors, students have shown feelings of institutional betrayal in university policy. A poll which surveyed students during the 2020 Fall semester through 2021 Winter semester at University of Oregon showed that over half of all responding students indicated feelings of institutional betrayal due to the university's handling of the COVID-19 pandemic.

Instructors and students have expressed feelings of betrayal incurred from university administration due to microaggressions and racial stress. Women in particular are at risk of experiencing institutional betrayal due in part to gender-based biases and microaggressions, as well as experience of campus sexual violence. Women of color are shown to more likely experience feelings of institutional betrayal regardless of whether they experienced campus sexual violence.

== In medicine ==
Institutional betrayal due to the medical industry is experienced by patients and providers. Patients and doctors can feel betrayed due to systemic issues in medicine (e.g., difficulties due to access, insurance, overall cost, etc.), problems related to organizational response, such as during the COVID-19 pandemic, or due to interpersonal issues between a patient and healthcare provider. Current studies being conducted in the Canadian healthcare system further broke down categories of institutional betrayal in two broad categories of "system level" and "doctor level" issues, identifying issues related to healthcare providers as not providing enough psychological support (e.g., not showing compassion, lack of communication, high emotional reactivity to patients) and inadequate medical care (e.g., failure to provide effective care due to lack of training or willingness, or providers not willing to consider alternative treatments or medicines). For example, abuse during childbirth is a primary factor of PTSD after birth, due to the high potential distress and power imbalance. It may prevent women from seeking pre-natal care and using other health care services in the future. In France, the movement #balancetonaccouchement has shed light on the institutional systematic dismissal of complaints by victims.

In the United States, mental health care is often handled by primary care physicians (PCPs) rather than by psychiatrists or other prescribing physicians who are specialized in mental health.

== Government betrayal ==
A sense of being misled, betrayed, or otherwise having one's rights violated by a state entity, institutional betrayal as it pertains to a political or governmental agency's influence on stress and trauma in members of some or all of a population. Police brutality and overreach are examples of institutional betrayal due to the nature of policing. Since police officers are intended to "serve and protect," brutality, violence, and oppression by the police creates a sense of mistrust and betrayal in government systems by victims and witnesses. In the summer of 2020, protests around the murder of George Floyd was a large-scale public outcry against police brutality which in part was due to a noted sense of institutional betrayal.

Soldiers may experience a sense of institutional betrayal from government agencies. In the United States, veterans of the Iraq War and War in Afghanistan experience institutional betrayal due to a lack of government-managed resources following their return from deployment. This may be due to perceived or factual issues with receiving benefits for medical or mental health care. Similar concerns have been raised by veterans of other wars fought by the United States, with Vietnam and Gulf War veterans expressing concerns of being betrayed or "forgotten" by the United States government following the end of their respective conflicts.

=== Moral injury ===
Moral injury is a form of trauma that refers to the impact of perpetrating, witnessing, or being a victim of an act that goes against the subject's worldview or set of personal values. Moral injury can be suffered by anyone, but is often associated with, and subsequently studied in populations of, soldiers or people who have participated in war. In soldiers, moral injury can be associated with a feeling of betrayal by a governmental entity, wherein a governmental agency or governing body is seen as an enabler or enforcer of wrongdoing. Aside from perpetration of wrongdoing on civilians or military personnel from another country, institutional betrayal through moral injury has been recently studied in cases of military sexual trauma.

== Institutional courage ==
Institutional courage is a concept described by psychologist Jennifer Freyd as the antidote to institutional betrayal. Institutional courage refers to "rightdoings" by which institutions demonstrate accountability, transparency, and support of individuals who are harmed within the context of the institution.

=== Institutional cowardice ===
Institutional cowardice is a concept examined by forensic psychologist Laura S. Brown as being the primary force that supports and exacerbates institutional betrayal when a problem is recognized by an institution. Institutional cowardice can be due to policy (e.g., a company not providing sick leave to workers dealing with mental health issues) or as a way for an individual to fall back on a supposed guideline or rule (e.g., someone refusing to offer concessions and stating that they are "just doing [their] job"). Freyd and Smith identified two dimensions of institutional betrayal which rely on axes that range from isolated incidents to systemic issues, and from betrayal by omission and commission. An example of institutional betrayal that is systemic and an error of commission would be an employer expecting an employee to work overtime without paying them for overtime. Brown suggests that institutional cowardice is primarily an issue of omission rather than commission. She uses examples such as consent forms that are provided to individuals after long-term fasting shortly before surgical procedures, or complaint forms "getting lost in the mail" to prevent an organization from recognizing an issue.

== See also ==
- Institutional abuse
- Structural abuse
- Military sexual trauma
- Betrayal trauma
- Obstetric violence
- Institutional trust
