= Murder of Donna Jones =

2009 murder case in Canada

Donna Jones
- Born: Donna Ellen Jones; December 25, 1975
- Died: December 5, 2009 (aged 33); Ottawa, Canada
- Cause of death: prolonged torture, burning, septic shock
- Education: Carleton University
- Spouse: Mark Peter Hutt (m. 2007)

Donna Ellen Jones (December 25, 1975 – December 5, 2009) was a Canadian woman who was murdered by her husband, Mark Peter Hutt, in Ottawa, Canada, in 2009. The 33-year-old's body was found in the basement of her home at Barwell Avenue, badly scalded, beaten, with broken bones, and having been shot with air gun pellets. She died of septic shock from infection due to untreated burns. Hutt was convicted of murder in 2013.

== Early life ==
Jones was raised in a home where she was "belittled" by her father, who taught her that she ought to "honour [her] husband." She was self-conscious about her weight and appearance. She was a graduate of Carleton University and had a civil service job with the Canadian Food Inspection Agency. Her friends used terms such as "bubbly," "outgoing," and "an absolute sunshine" to describe Jones.

== Life with Mark Hutt ==
Jones met Mark Peter Hutt in the summer of 2005, when they were introduced by a mutual friend. She soon began to pull away from friends and family. Her previously outstanding performance at her job in the federal public service began to slip. Friends began to notice signs of domestic abuse, such as bruises on Jones' body, and overhearing phone conversations between Jones and Hutt where Hutt verbally abused her. He would frequently call her to check up on her when she was with friends. Before the couple's planned September 2007 wedding, friends planned a formal intervention, begging Jones to call it off, but when it did not work, backed out of her wedding party. Two years later, Jones's weight had dropped from 162 pounds (73 kg) to 101 pounds (46 kg).

Hutt was emotionally and financially dependent on Jones. Hundreds of notes found in her home reveal Hutt’s Dr. Jekyll and Mr. Hyde nature — in one calling Jones a “terrible wife,” in another insisting, "You are my angel." Jones, previously frugal, was preparing to file for bankruptcy after she had indulged Hutt with his desires for a truck, an ATV, a snowmobile, a snowboard and other items. Several months before Jones's death, oozing burns on her arms appeared, seeming to have become infected, but Jones reportedly refused medical attention.

== Murder ==
Jones was found, dead, on a mattress made of couch pillows, in the basement of her house on December 6, 2009. Hutt admitted to dousing Jones with boiling water, but waited 11 days, after she was no longer breathing, to call 911. Though Hutt claimed Jones was alive and talking three hours before he called 911, forensic evidence indicated that she had died up to 12 hours before the call.

Hutt claimed at first that Jones had fallen into a fire pit, then later that he had accidentally burned his wife 11 days earlier with a pot of boiling water and had tried to treat her at home after she refused to go to the hospital. About 40% of Jones' body had been burned. Although Jones spoke to a handful of people on the phone after the scalding, including her mother, she did not tell anyone that she was hurt nor did she call 911 herself. The Crown attorney argued that Jones was protecting Hutt because of a "trauma bond." Friends of Jones made a third-party complaint to police alleging Hutt’s abuse the day after Jones was scalded, but it was left uninvestigated until after her body was found.

== Trial ==
During the autopsy, 29 pellets from an air rifle were found lodged in Jones' skin. Forensic pathologist Christopher Milroy testified that the gun must have been fired from the short distance of a few feet for the pellets to have penetrated the skin. Some pellets were in Jones's body for quite some time and he said Jones showed signs of lead poisoning, although the level was not high enough to poison her. She was likely shot with at least two of those pellets after the scalding. She also had nine fractured ribs, a broken nose, two black eyes and many cuts, bruises and scrapes on her head, knees and legs. Milroy said these injuries were caused after Jones was burned on November 24, 2009. Jones' body had other injuries including seven calloused ribs, which suggested an earlier fracture likely caused by kicks, as well as two recent rib fractures, a broken left finger, fractured right wrist and an earlier forearm break known as a "nightstick fracture", caused by a blow to the arm raised in a defensive position. Joel Fish, medical director of the burn unit of the Hospital for Sick Children in Toronto, testified as a burn expert. According to Fish, had Jones received proper medical treatment, she would have had a "virtually 100 per cent" chance of survival. Hutt's defence lawyer Lorne Goldstein did not contest that Hutt abused Jones, but pointed out that her many broken bones, bruises and cuts did not cause her death. Goldstein conceded that Hutt had tortured Jones "beyond comprehension". The defence presented no witnesses.

Hutt pleaded guilty to the lesser charge of criminal negligence causing death. The Crown rejected his plea and argued he was guilty of first-degree murder. A jury took less than a day to deliberate and on June 7, 2013, found Hutt guilty of first-degree murder. Life in prison with no chance of parole for 25 years, the maximum penalty in Canada, is the automatic sentence.
