= Institutional trust (social sciences) =

Institutional trust is a dynamic relationship between an individual and an institution. It is a form/sub-type of trust and is distinguished by the potential magnitude of its effect.

The relationship can be analyzed through techniques developed for the analysis of interpersonal ties. The form of the relationship may be explicit (or implicit) and internal (or external) to an institution in both perception and reality. The disposition of the relationship can be qualified as positive, neutral or negative. The strength of the relationship is quantifiable through a relative percentage from 0% (weak) to 100% (strong) and a degree of separation (for example, 1 degree of separation means the trust relationship is direct, see Six degrees of separation).

The characteristics of the relationship may change over variable periods of time (from instantaneously to slowly).

Institutional trust is often expressed through a value judgment. It has major implications in all fields of study, especially power dynamics, including (but not limited to) forms of power (social and political).

== See also ==
- Institutional betrayal
