= Representational momentum =

Representational momentum is a small, but reliable, error in our visual perception of moving objects. Representational moment was discovered and named by Jennifer Freyd and Ronald Finke. Instead of knowing the exact location of a moving object, viewers actually think it is a bit further along its trajectory as time goes forward. For example, people viewing an object moving from left to right that suddenly disappears will report they saw it a bit further to the right than where it actually vanished. While not a big error, it has been found in a variety of different events ranging from simple rotations to camera movement through a scene. The name "representational momentum" initially reflected the idea that the forward displacement was the result of the perceptual system having internalized, or evolved to include, basic principles of Newtonian physics, but it has come to mean forward displacements that continue a presented pattern along a variety of dimensions, not just position or orientation. As with many areas of cognitive psychology, theories can focus on bottom-up or top-down aspects of the task. Bottom-up theories of representational momentum highlight the role of eye movements and stimulus presentation, while top-down theories highlight the role of the observer's experience and expectations regarding the presented event.

== Methods ==
Representational Momentum has been studied using two types of displays: implied motion (left panel) and smooth animations (right panel). Implied events show a series of pictures that suggest a motion, but at a slow frame rate so there is no apparent motion. Smooth animations have also been used, where the animation is briefly interrupted and then participants either indicate whether a static probe is in the same position as the final frame of the animation (right panel), or are asked to indicate with a mouse cursor exactly where the object disappeared. The basic result is that participants either use the mouse to click beyond the vanishing point, or misidentify forward positioned probes as the location where the object disappeared. So, instead of indicating that the actual 0° probe in a rotation event is the same, participants will say that probes appearing 2°-4° past the vanishing point actually seem to be at the vanishing point itself. However, they will quite readily reject probes that are behind the vanishing point by 2°-4°.

Schematic of implied motion trial. Rectangle appears for 250 ms, followed by a blank screen for 250 ms (here slightly transparent so previous rectangle is visible). Subsequent orientations are rotated by 17°, with test probes rotations sampled between 0 and up to ±8°. Task is to determine whether third and fourth orientations were identical. People typically incorrectly identify forward probes as being identical, suggesting they have continued the implied motion of the rectangle.	The green cube rotates 50° about vertical axis, briefly disappears (250 ms) and probe appears. The task is to determine if cube reappears in exactly the same orientation. In this demo, the cube actually returns 4° further along the trajectory, though it will likely look as if it returned exactly to where it vanished.

== Specific results ==
Initial studies established that representational momentum occurs for rotations in and movements across the picture plane, with larger distortions occurring with faster velocities and when downward motion is presented. Moreover, the overall pattern of the motion is anticipated, so that when shown an oscillatory motion, like a pendulum, the object is remembered as continuing the larger pattern. In other words, when asked to judge where the object is just as it would normally reverse directions, probes in the reverse direction are accepted as same, not probes that would continue the most immediate, local motion.

=== The importance of labeling ===
The degree of representational momentum observed can depend on how the participant is labeling the event or object. For example, if told just before a trial that the object will "crash" against a wall, smaller distortions will be observed than if told the object is going to "bounce." More representational momentum is also observed when participants are told a triangular shape is a "rocket" compared to when the same shape is called a "church," however, the overall pointedness of the shape is more important than object identity.

=== Motion in depth ===
Objects can rotate about many different depth axes (e.g., consider the difference between a somersault and a spin) and more representational momentum occurs with axes of rotation that run through the center of the object compared to off-center rotations. When presented with an event depicting the view from a camera moving through a scene, representational momentum occurs for the camera view, both for rotations (like turning your head) and movements in the scene. More representational momentum occurs for views where objects are entering the scene, compared to rotating out of view (see example movies).

Bench rotating out of view, probe is actually identical to final view, but likely it looks like the bench jumps backwards	Planters rotating into view, probe is +2°, but likely looks correct as you have continued the camera's motion

=== Sound ===
Auditory representational momentum has been found for sounds moving about the listener, but patterns of change can be established in dimensions beyond position. For example, consider a rising tone in pitch. Auditory representational momentum, where a pitch further along the presented pattern is misidentified as the actual ending pitch, has been found for both simple rises and falls in pitch, along with more complicated periodic patterns.

=== Expertise ===
Individual differences in the magnitude of representational momentum reveal that extensive training and experience with particular kinds of dynamic events allow experts to more readily continue the motion of the display. In particular, pilots with extensive experience (average 3,198 of flying hours) showed more representational momentum to flight simulator landing scenes than did novices. Novices showed no forward distortion with the forward probes pilots anticipated, but when smaller anticipations were probed, novices were able to anticipate forward motion. Experts more readily anticipate the dynamic scene, resulting in larger representational momentum.

=== Grasping ===
Being able to estimate an object's size in order to pick it up involves an integration of visual information and motor control. Upon viewing implied motion depicting the handles of a pair of pliers either opening or closing, participants change their physical hand grip size in keeping with representational momentum, anticipating the future position of the handles. While the hand action anticipates the continued opening (or closing) of the pliers, visual judgments of the object's final handle position consistently underestimate the opening, indicating that the relationship between visual judgments and subsequent physical acts is not straightforward.

=== Luminance ===
Events depicting changes in luminance, or how bright a patch of color appears, do not lead to forward distortions in memory similar to representational momentum, but instead show backwards distortions. In other words, upon viewing an object getting progressively lighter and asked to remember the final shade, participants accept a darker version of the object (where a representational momentum parallel would be to accept a lighter shade). One suggestion for this difference is that memory is playing more of a role in determining color.
