= Jennifer Freyd =

American academic (born 1957)

- Education: University of Pennsylvania, Stanford University
- Known for: Research on Betrayal Trauma, DARVO, Institutional Betrayal, and Institutional Courage
- Website: www.jjfreyd.com

Jennifer Joy Freyd (/fraɪd/) is an American psychologist, researcher, author, educator, and speaker. Freyd is best known for her theories of betrayal trauma, DARVO, institutional betrayal, and institutional courage.

Freyd is the Founder and President of the Center for Institutional Courage, Professor Emerit of Psychology at the University of Oregon, and Affiliate Professor of Psychology and Affiliate Professor of Gender, Women & Sexuality Studies, University of Washington.

Freyd was a Member of the Advisory Committee, 2019–2023, for the Action Collaborative on Preventing Sexual Harassment in Higher Education, National Academies of Science, Engineering, and Medicine. She is a Fellow of the American Psychological Association, the American Psychological Society, and the American Association for the Advancement of Science. From 2005 to 2023, Freyd was the editor of the Journal of Trauma & Dissociation.

Early in her career, Freyd was a John Simon Guggenheim Fellow and she received a National Science Foundation Presidential Young Investigator Award. In April 2016, Freyd was awarded the Lifetime Achievement Award from the International Society for the Study of Trauma & Dissociation. In 1989-90 and again in 2018–2019 academic years Freyd was a Fellow at Stanford University's Center for Advanced Study in the Behavioral Sciences.

== Education ==
Freyd attended Friends Select School in Philadelphia and after three years of high school was admitted to the University of Pennsylvania where she received a Bachelor of Arts degree in Anthropology. In 1983 she earned her Ph.D. in psychology at Stanford University.

== Career ==
Freyd was an assistant professor at Cornell University from 1983 to 1987, until she was hired with tenure as an associate professor of psychology at the University of Oregon in 1987. In 1992, Freyd was promoted to full professor at the University of Oregon.

In 2017, Freyd filed suit against the University of Oregon for violating the Equal Pay Act, the Equal Protection Clause, and Title IX during her decades of employment. Women's and civil rights groups have collaborated on amicus briefs, including Equal Rights Advocates, the ACLU Women's Rights Project, the National Women's Law Center, the American Association of University Professors. The case was heard by the Ninth Circuit Court of Appeals. The Ninth Circuit ruled in favor of Freyd's appeal on March 15, 2021.

=== Research and theory ===
In the last two decades, Freyd has researched and written extensively on sexual abuse and memory. Freyd's initial empirical discovery of representational momentum and shareability led her to further explore the relationship between trauma memories and the element of betrayal. Freyd introduced the following original concepts to the trauma literature: betrayal trauma, betrayal blindness, DARVO, institutional betrayal, and institutional courage.

Betrayal trauma is defined as a trauma perpetrated by someone whom the victim is close to and reliant upon for support and survival.

DARVO is an acronym used to describe a common strategy of abusers. The abuser may: Deny the abuse ever took place, Attack the victim for attempting to hold the abuser accountable; and claim that they, the abuser, are the real victim in the situation, thus Reversing the Victim and Offender.

Institutional betrayal refers to "wrongdoings perpetrated by an institution upon individuals dependent on that institution, including failure to prevent or respond supportively to wrongdoings by individuals (e.g. sexual assault) committed within the context of the institution". It is an extension of betrayal trauma theory. In a 2013 study, Carly P. Smith and Jennifer Freyd documented the psychological harm caused by institutional betrayal.

Freyd introduced the term institutional courage in 2014.

In a September 2019 article in the Journal of Trauma & Dissociation, Freyd and Smidt emphasize the value of education for organizations that are taking steps toward institutional courage. The authors make a distinction between training (which connotes "compliance and a rules-based process") and education, which "is associated with complex understanding, critical thinking, and the acquisition of knowledge based on empirical research and theory development". As it concerns sexual violence (a primary focus of Freyd's research), education is needed to help society understand "major aspects of the frequency, consequences, and dynamics of sexual harassment and assault".

In early 2019, Freyd announced a new research initiative to promote the study of institutional courage. The project supported interdisciplinary research on the interconnected problems of sexual violence, DARVO, and institutional betrayal, as well as ways in which institutional courage can flourish. Freyd described her current research agenda on institutional betrayal and courage and intention to create a nonprofit organization, The Center for Institutional Courage, on a December 2019 episode of the Human Centered podcast. Freyd described the Center for Institutional Courage as "roughly equal parts a research center that can nurture new knowledge generation, and an outreach part that applies that knowledge to the world". In early 2020, Freyd and her colleagues incorporated the Center for Institutional Courage, an institution dedicated to scientific research, wide-reaching education, and data-driven action promoting institutional courage. In 2021, the Center for Institutional Courage funded 15 research projects on the topics of institutional courage, institutional betrayal, and DARVO.

== Activism ==
Because of her research on sexual assault and institutional betrayal, Freyd was invited to the White House in 2014 to meet with White House advisors on violence against women, as well as New York Senator Kirsten Gillibrand, to discuss how her research relates to campus sexual violence. In June 2017, Freyd was invited again to speak at a meeting of the National Academies of Sciences, Engineering, and Medicine, where she presented on institutional betrayal and sexual harassment in academia. In an open essay, entitled "Gender Discrimination, Dr. Jennifer Freyd's Lawsuit, & Recommendations for Universities," the author underscored the far-reaching consequences of gender discrimination against women in higher education.

Freyd's research on sexual violence and institutional betrayal has become increasingly prominent with the rise of the Me Too movement and growing societal awareness of the prevalence of sexual harassment and assault. For example, in an interview with Diane Sawyer in 2017, actress and political activist Ashley Judd referenced DARVO when discussing the Harvey Weinstein sexual abuse allegations.

Freyd has focused on ensuring that survivors do not lose their voice in the process of reporting sexual violence. Freyd asserted that since institutions can perpetrate abuse by (1) ignoring survivors' wishes about how their private information is shared when they decide to disclose, and (2) by emphasizing that survivors' information will be passed along without their consent, she proposed that faculty educate colleagues and students about Title IX, sexual violence, and institutional betrayal, as well as provide resources for disrupting a culture of sexual violence and learning how to be a good listener. Freyd has proposed 10 steps by which institutions (including universities) can make progress toward institutional courage, such as encouraging whistleblowing and carrying out assessments of institutional betrayal through anonymous surveys. The Chronicle of Higher Education has covered the ongoing debate at the University of Oregon and the Association of American Universities (AAU). Dozens of scientists have criticized the AAU's proposed campus climate survey, with Freyd as a key player in the scientific debate.

In 2021, Freyd argued that academic institutions should cease the use of the gendered honorary titles 'emeritus' and 'emerita' and instead adopt the gender-neutral term 'emerit'. As of early 2022, both the University of Oregon and Oregon State University are considering dropping the gendered titles in favor of 'emerit' or a similar gender-neutral alternative.

== Personal life ==
Freyd was married to John Quincy "JQ" Johnson III, from 1984 until his death in 2012. Together they have three children.

Around 1990, Freyd allegedly uncovered memories of her father, mathematics professor Peter J. Freyd, abusing her during her childhood. Her parents, Pamela and Peter Freyd, disputed Freyd's claims of sexual assault, and in 1992 co-founded the False Memory Syndrome Foundation, which has been described as a US "advocacy group [...] for people claiming to have been wrongly accused of physical and sexual abuse." Three years after its founding, it had more than 7,500 members. The foundation was dissolved on December 31, 2019.

== Awards ==
Freyd was selected for the 2021 Christine Blasey Ford Woman of Courage Award by the Association for Women in Psychology. In 2024 Freyd received the Gold Medal Award for Impact in Psychology from the American Psychological Foundation. Freyd received an honorary doctorate from Claremont Graduate University in May 2024.

== Selected publications ==
=== Books ===
- Freyd, J. J. (1996). Betrayal Trauma: The Logic of Forgetting Childhood Abuse. Harvard University Press, Cambridge, MA. ISBN 978-0-674-06805-6..
- Freyd, J. J.; Anne P. DePrince (2001). Trauma and cognitive science: a meeting of minds, science, and human experience. Haworth Press. ISBN 978-0-7890-1374-3.
- Freyd, J. J.; Pamela J. Birrell (2013). Blind to Betrayal: Why we fool ourselves we aren't being fooled. Somerset, New Jersey: Wiley. ISBN 978-0-470-60440-3.

=== Selected Chapters in books ===
- Freyd, J. J.; Quina, K. (2000), "Feminist ethics in the practice of science: The contested memory controversy as an example", in Brabeck, M. (ed.), Practicing Feminist Ethics in Psychology (PDF), Washington, D.C.: American Psychological Association, pp. 101–124, ISBN 978-1-55798-623-8
- Freyd, J. J. (2002), "Memory and dimensions of trauma: Terror may be 'all-too-well remembered' and betrayal buried", in Conte, J.R. (ed.), Critical Issues in Child Sexual Abuse: Historical, Legal, and Psychological Perspectives (PDF), Thousand Oaks, California: SAGE Publications, pp. 139–173, ISBN 978-0-7619-0912-5

=== Selected Journal articles ===
- Freyd, J.J. (1983). Shareability: the social psychology of epistemology. Cognitive Science, 7, 191–210. https://doi.org/10.1207/s15516709cog0703_2
- Freyd, J.J., & Finke, R.A. (1984). Representational momentum. Journal of Experimental Psychology: Learning, Memory, and Cognition, 10, 126–132. https://doi.org/10.1037/0278-7393.10.1.126
- Freyd, J.J. (1987). Dynamic mental representations. Psychological Review, 94, 427–438. https://doi.org/10.1037/0033-295X.94.4.427
- Freyd, J. J. (1994). "Betrayal trauma: Traumatic amnesia as an adaptive response to childhood abuse". Ethics & Behavior. 4 (4): 307–329. doi:10.1207/s15327019eb0404_1. Pdf.
- Freyd, J. J. (1997). "Violations of power, adaptive blindness, and betrayal trauma theory". Feminism and Psychology. 7: 22–32. doi:10.1177/0959353597071004. S2CID 143672491. Pdf.
- Freyd, J. J. (1998). "Science in the memory debate". Ethics & Behavior. 8 (2): 101–113. doi:10.1207/s15327019eb0802_1. Pdf.
- Freyd, J. J.; DePrince, A. P.; Zurbriggen, E. L. (2001). "Self-reported memory for abuse depends upon victim-perpetrator relationship". Journal of Trauma & Dissociation. 2 (3): 5–17. doi:10.1300/j229v02n03_02. S2CID 17149424. Pdf.
- Freyd, J. J.; Putnam, F.W.; Lyon, T.D.; Becker-Blease, K.A.; Cheit, R.E.; Siegel, N.B.; Pezdek, K. (2005). "The science of child sexual abuse". Science. 308 (5721): 501. doi:10.1126/science.1108066. PMID 15845837. S2CID 70752683. Pdf.
- Becker Blease, K.A. & Freyd, J.J. (2007). The Ethics of Asking about Abuse and the Harm of "Don't Ask Don't Tell". American Psychologist, 62, 330–332. https://doi.org/10.1037/0003-066X.61.3.218
- Freyd, J. J. (2012). "A plea to university researchers". Journal of Trauma & Dissociation. 13 (5): 497–508. doi:10.1080/15299732.2012.708613. PMID 22989239. S2CID 14798947. Pdf.
- Freyd, J. J. (2013). "Preventing betrayal". Journal of Trauma & Dissociation. 14 (5): 495–500. doi:10.1080/15299732.2013.824945. PMID 24060032. S2CID 43820112. Pdf.
- Smith, C.P. & Freyd, J.J. (2014). Institutional betrayal. American Psychologist, 69, 575–587. https://doi.org/10.1037/a0037564
- Freyd, J. J. (2015). "Proposal for a National Institute on Sexual Violence". Journal of Trauma & Dissociation. 16 (5): 497–499. doi:10.1080/15299732.2015.1069170. PMID 26458061. S2CID 46613952. Pdf.
- Freyd, J. J. (2017). "Attributes, behaviors, or experiences? Lessons from research on trauma regarding gender differences". Journal of Trauma & Dissociation. 18 (5): 645–648. doi:10.1080/15299732.2017.1358687. PMID 28816648. Pdf.
- Freyd, J.J. (2018). When sexual assault victims speak out, their institutions often betray them, The Conversation, 11 January 2018. https://theconversation.com/when-sexual-assault-victims-speak-out-their-institutions-often-betray-them-87050
- Smidt, A.M., Adams-Clark, A.A., & Freyd, J.J. (2023). Institutional courage buffers against institutional betrayal, protects employee health, and fosters organizational commitment following workplace sexual harassment, PLOS ONE 18(1): e0278830. https://doi.org/10.1371/journal.pone.0278830
- Harsey, S., Adams-Clark, A.A., & Freyd, J. J. (2024). Associations between defensive victim-blaming responses (DARVO), rape myth acceptance, and sexual harassment. PLOS ONE. e0313642. https://doi.org/10.1371/journal.pone.0313642.
