= Greg Tufaro =

American astrologer

- Born: February 19, 1976 (age 50); Queens, New York, United States (New York (state))
- Website: www.gregtufaro.com

Greg Tufaro (born February 19, 1976), a.k.a. Astrolo-G, is an astrologer and four-time Emmy Award-winning television producer who was born in Queens, New York, USA. Greg was the astrologer on two seasons of HGTV's "What's Your Sign? Design" and now works on Good Morning America.

Tufaro graduated from Dartmouth College with a bachelor's degree in psychology and did post-graduate work at Georgetown University's Special Masters program in physiology and biophysics. He has appeared on The Tyra Banks Show, Entertainment Tonight, Rachael Ray, Glenn Beck, The Joy Behar Show, and Good Morning America and in the daily syndicated daytime pilot for NBC, Fresh Squeezed with Hoda and Toure, in the segment “Total E-clips”. In 2009, he was featured as Dear Astrolo-G on The Morning Show with Mike and Juliet and wrote a monthly astrological column on love, relationships, career and finances for Fox News’ internet magazine, iMag, and appeared on SIRIUS satellite radio.
