= Journal of Communication =

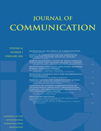
- Discipline: Communication studies
- Language: English
- Edited by: R. Lance Holbert

Publication details
- History: 1951-present
- Publisher: Oxford University Press
- Frequency: Bimonthly
- Impact factor: 3.753 (2018)

Standard abbreviations
- ISO 4: J. Commun.

Indexing
- ISSN: 0021-9916 (print); 1460-2466 (web)
- LCCN: 56046080
- OCLC no.: 01754508

Links
- Journal homepage; Journal page at association's website

The Journal of Communication is a bimonthly peer-reviewed academic journal that publishes articles and book reviews on a broad range of issues in communication theory and research. It was established in 1951 and the current editors-in-chief are David R. Ewoldsen (Michigan State University), Natascha Just (University of Zurich), Chul-joo "CJ" Lee (Seoul National University), and Keren Tenenboim-Weinblatt (Hebrew University of Jerusalem). According to the Journal Citation Reports, its 2018 impact factor is 3.753. The Journal of Communication is ranked fifth out of 88 journals in the category "Communication". It is published by Oxford University Press on behalf of the International Communication Association. Previously it was published by Wiley Online Library.

== Editors ==
The following persons have been editor-in-chief of the journal:

- 2023-Present: David R. Ewoldsen (Michigan State University)
- 2023-Present: Natascha Just (University of Zurich)
- 2023-Present: Chul-joo "CJ" Lee (Seoul National University)
- 2023-Present: Keren Tenenboim-Weinblatt (Hebrew University of Jerusalem)
- 2019-2023: R. Lance Holbert (Temple University)
- 2015–2019: Silvio Waisbord (George Washington University)
- 2011–2015: Malcolm R. Parks (University of Washington)
- 2009–2012: Michael J. Cody (University of Southern California)
- 2006–2008: Michael Pfau (University of Oklahoma)
- 2003–2005: William L. Benoit (Ohio University)
- 2000–2002: Jon F. Nussbaum (Pennsylvania State University)
- 1997–1999: Alan M. Rubin (Kent State University)
- 1992–1996: Mark Levy (Michigan State University)
- 1974–1991: George Gerbner (University of Pennsylvania)
- 1973: Daniel E. Costello (University of Iowa)
- 1971–1972: Paul D. Holtzman (Pennsylvania State University)
- 1968–1970: Sam Duker (Brooklyn College)
- 1965–1967: Theodore Clevenger Jr. (University of Pittsburgh)
- 1962–1964: Frank E. X. Dance (University of Denver)
- 1959–1961: Wayne N. Thompson (University of Illinois, Chicago)
- 1956–1958: C. Merton Babcock (Michigan State University)
- 1953–1955: Francis A. Cartier
- 1951–1952: Thomas R. Lewis
