= Malcolm Parks =

American academic

Malcolm Ross Parks is an American academic, professor emeritus of communication at the University of Washington.

He earned a Ph.D. from Michigan State University in 1976, working under the supervision of Gerald R. Miller. His interests are in interpersonal relationships, organizational change, persuasion, and social networks.

He serves on the board of the Journal of Computer-Mediated Communication and has been editor-in-chief of the Journal of Communication. He was considered a scholar and a visionary.

== Books ==
- Parks, M. R. (2006). Personal Relationships and Personal Networks. Mahwah, NJ: Lawrence Erlbaum Associates. ISBN 978-0-8058-6104-4
