= Betrayal trauma =

Trauma perpetrated by someone close to the victim

Betrayal trauma is defined as a trauma perpetrated by someone with whom the victim is close to and reliant upon for support and survival. The concept was originally introduced by Jennifer Freyd in 1994. Betrayal trauma theory (BTT) addresses situations when people or institutions on which a person relies for protection, resources, and survival violate the trust or well-being of that person. BTT emphasizes the importance of betrayal as a core antecedent of dissociation, implicitly aimed at preserving the relationship with the caregiver. BTT suggests that an individual (e.g. a child or spouse), being dependent on another (e.g. their caregiver or partner) for support, will have a higher need to dissociate traumatic experiences from conscious awareness in order to preserve the relationship.

== Background ==
Betrayal trauma theory emerged to integrate evolutionary processes, mental modules, social cognitions, and developmental needs with the extent to which the fundamental ethic of human relationships are violated. A foundational component of the dissociative aspect of BTT postulates that all humans possess an inherent mental mechanism to detect violations of social contracts (i.e., "cheater detectors"). BTT posits that in the context of abusive relationships in which escape is not a viable option, the cheater-detecting mechanism may be suppressed for the higher goal of survival. Thus, betrayal trauma offers a theory of psychogenic amnesia designed to evaluate both the role of attachment in human survival and the significance of blocking the painful experience.

== Types ==
=== Child sexual abuse ===
Child sexual abuse (CSA) can involve molestation by one or more caregivers or close relatives. While physical and emotional abuse during childhood is present in the context of BTT, research has found that CSA leads to more significant disruption in capacities and is more characteristic of a substantial violation of human ethics. Notably, the degree to which one is violated by a caregiver or close relationship can influence the nature of and response to trauma. BTT suggests that CSA is closely linked with psychogenic amnesia or other dissociative processes occurring as a means to maintain an attachment with the caregiver and promote survival. For the victim to acknowledge the violation of CSA could increase their risk of impaired attachment provided by the caregiver and increase the potential of danger to the child. Such trauma has direct links to eliciting the process of "betrayal blindness". Similarly, evidence suggests that such trauma is more likely to be forgotten as compared to non-sexual childhood abuse. In order to help mitigate such trauma being forgotten or children being re-victimized, early interventions have been suggested. These early intervention efforts are thought to help with the long-term consequences of betrayal trauma.

=== Institutional betrayal ===
Institutional betrayal refers to wrongdoings perpetrated when an institution fails to prevent or appropriately respond to wrongdoings by other individuals. In instances when individuals experiencing traumatic events place a great deal of trust in the legal, medical, and mental health systems to address their wrongs they risk disbelief, blame, and refusal of help. Priorities of the institution, such as protecting their reputation, may increase the likelihood that institutions fail to respond appropriately. Institutions may strenuously attempt to prevent knowledge of said assaults from surfacing, which can take the form of attempting to silence the individual. Lack of validation and interpersonal trauma from institutional betrayal can be examined through a BTT lens and have been described as a "second assault", which can exacerbate the effects of the initial trauma incurred.

==== Academic institutions ====
Betrayal trauma via institutional betrayal can be particularly pervasive in environments that normalize abusive contexts, adopt procedures and policies that are unclear and potentially stigmatising, support cover-ups and misinformation, and punish victims and whistle blowers. Sexual assaults which take place on college campuses in which the system is unhelpful and unresponsive constitute BT. Similarly, sexual assault committed by close others in the context that the betrayal is implicit, and challenging to detect, has received increased attention in the media through campaigns oriented to highlight the prevalence of abuse in professional and academic institutions.

In the 2010s literature has expanded in this area to evaluate minority populations such as gender and sexual minorities (GSM), who may be at increased risk of experiencing institutional betrayal in academic institutions.

==== Military ====
In an effort to directly measure institutional betrayal, results from comparisons of female veterans who experienced civilian sexual assault and those who experienced sexual assault in the United States military indicated that institutional betrayal was higher in military contexts when members were highly dependent upon the military for safety, protection, and employment. Although research investigating military sexual trauma (MST) is still in its infancy, literature has identified the perpetrator-victim relationship as a primary impediment to reporting the assault which could impact job status and contribute to disruptions in unit cohesion, ostracization, inability to leave or transfer duty stations.

Evidence evaluating the impact of assault or harassment during military service, and medical care is fraught with victim blaming and implicit policies of disrespectful treatment. Additionally emerging research has found that institutions (e.g., occupational settings, religious organizations, and schools) have the potential to worsen posttraumatic outcomes or be a source of social harm and injustice.

==== Law enforcement ====
Literature indicates that the U.S. police force has a demonstrably long history of using coercive force. However, recent deaths suspected to be the result of police officers using excessive force (e.g., shooting of Stephon Clark, shooting of Philando Castile) have shone light upon the issue of police brutality as a form of institutional betrayal. Research has identified that cultural minorities tend to experience police brutality more frequently than their European American counterparts due to stereotypes associating criminal activity with race/ethnicity, particularly in urban areas where crime rates are high and the presence of cultural minorities is more prevalent. Additionally, recent studies have identified mentally ill individuals as being at a higher risk for experiencing police brutality, especially with regard to suicide by cop.

==== Healthcare system ====
Emerging literature has articulated a need for furthering research that evaluates the prevalence and impact of institutional betrayal in healthcare settings, with an emphasis on understanding the relationship between the level of trust patients place in physicians, associated expectations that physicians will prioritize protections to patients' welfare, and incurred adverse medical experiences which are conceptualized as institutional betrayal.

=== Romantic betrayal ===
When evaluating betrayal trauma in romantic relationships, earlier literature focused on the impact of infidelity in monogamous relationships. Within this context, the betrayal is present in the relationship as a breach of an unspoken agreement. More recent literature exploring BTT in romantic partnerships has focused on the inclusion of domestic violence (DV). DV involves a betrayal of trust when one partner is repeatedly beaten, degraded, and violated and has been shown to constitute BTT, particularly in instances when the victim remains with or returns to the abuser, does not report the abuse, or underreports the severity of ongoing abuse which have been linked to deep feelings of shame and anxiety in the victim. Attachment injury has been indicated as an additional component of BTT in romantic contexts, characterized by abandonment or betrayal of trust during moments of need.

In the context of intimate partner violence (IPV), vulnerability/fear, relationship expectations, shame/low self-esteem, and communication issues are suggested to be ways exposure to betrayal trauma manifests and subsequently serves as a barrier to forming new romantic relationships.

== Key features ==
=== Attachment theory ===
John Bowlby in 1969 was the first to identify the link between attachment processes and dissociative psychopathology. He referred to internal representations as Internal Working Models (IWM) with which one can discern which internal content is dominant and warrants attention, and which such content can be segregated into one's unconscious awareness. Once the attachment system is activated, the IWM is identified as a guide to the formation of both the attachment behavior and the appraisal of attachment emotions in self and others. Bowlby emphasizes that traumatizing experiences with one's caregiver are likely to have detrimental effects on a child's attachment security, stress responses, coping strategies, and sense of self.

Securely organized IWM: Evidence indicates that secure attachment is associated with positive appraisals of one's own attachment emotions and expectations that the child's request will be experienced as significant and legitimate by their caregiver.

Insecurely organized IWM (avoidant or resistant): Associated with a negative appraisal of attachment emotions and expectations that one's request for attention and attachment will be received as a nuisance or an intrusion to the caregiver.

Disorganized IWM: Linked to unresolved traumas and losses experienced by the caregiver and the effect had on the subsequent attachment style with their offspring. Main and Hesse in 1990 theorized that in the context of BTT disorganized attachment develops when the caregiver is both a source of the child's solution and a source of fright. This form of attachment is proposed to more frequently experience altered consciousness akin to dissociation.

=== Dissociation ===
Dissociation is described as the disruption of conscious memory, identity, or perception of one's immediate environment. Freyd and colleagues (2007) identified "knowledge isolation" or the extent to which information is hidden from awareness. From a neurological perspective, dissociation during times of extreme stress or trauma can invoke neural mechanisms resulting in long-term alterations in brain functioning. Additional evidence has implicated the effect of childhood trauma as an etiological factor of dissociation. Research suggests that the level of betrayal trauma experienced (e.g., high, moderate, low) can influence the degree of dissociation. Low betrayal trauma (LBT) are conceptualized as no less severe than high betrayal trauma (HBT), yet are posited to lack the violation of trust which characterizes HBT. Additionally, consolidated empirical evidence has indicated that exposure to HBT is linked to increased levels of dissociation and impaired memory of trauma-related words as compared to low dissociators.

Trauma and stressor-related disorders frequently include dissociative experiences. Evidence suggests that dissociation during trauma enables affected individuals to compartmentalize the traumatic experience from their conscious awareness. In the context of BTT, dissociation is conceptualized as an adaptive process aimed to maintain self-preservation and serve as protection against psychological pain. Perspectives from the development of psychopathology paired with attachment theory cite the mechanism of dissociation as a core feature in understanding environmentally produced psychiatric disorders. Evidence has indicated that dissociation can occur in extreme cases, when an alternative personality state can emerge (i.e. altered), as frequently implicated in the dissociative identity disorder (DID).

=== Loss of the assumptive world ===
The assumptive world refers to a core belief system reflecting that individuals perceive the world as secure and fair. Janoff-Bulman (1992) identified three assumptions (e.g. the world as benevolent, meaningful, and worthy), which can be shattered by distortions in social behavior. In the context of BTT, violations perpetrated by caregivers or close relationships have been implicated to impair views of the assumptive world and contribute to avoidance of the trauma experienced.

== Presence in psychopathology ==
Models of attachment-based dissociative disorders and trauma-related disorders involving betrayal trauma have been indicated in diagnostic groups such as post-traumatic stress disorder, personality disorders, trauma and stress-related disorders, dissociative disorders, schizophrenia spectrum and other psychotic disorders and substance-related and addictive disorders. Many of these disorders can result from betrayal trauma, and such trauma should be explored as a possible contributor to symptoms.

=== Post-traumatic stress disorder ===
BTT includes individuals who experience little or no conscious awareness of their trauma. If the trauma survivor does not have conscious knowledge, the effects of the abuse can manifest instead with physical and psychological symptoms such as dissociation. Many have found that dissociation can be a predictor of developing post-traumatic stress disorder (PTSD).

=== Dissociative identity disorder ===
Some trauma victims deploy a protective response such as dissociation or repression to block awareness of the trauma. BTT indicates that childhood sexual abuse and other interpersonal injuries create the dissociative reaction. Dissociative identity disorder (DID) is commonly connected with prolonged overwhelming trauma such as childhood sexual abuse. This trauma can create a disruption in identity where there are two or more distinct personalities in one person where perception, cognition, and sense of self and agency is different. The person may experience gaps in the recall of everyday events or traumatic events.

=== Substance use disorders ===
There have been suggestions that interpersonal trauma such as betrayal trauma can in some cases have links to substance use. This substance use may be episodic binge drinking or chronic substance use that can meet diagnostic criteria for substance use disorder. Research found that childhood physical or sexual abuse is at increased risk for substance abuse. Some postulate that because betrayal trauma can create a loss of control that loss of control incorporates into substance use. Others think substance use is a way to cope with posttraumatic negative affect traits such as avoidance, tension reduction or self-medication.

=== Personality disorders ===
The development of borderline personality disorder (BPD) may have links to early maltreatment and attachment difficulties. The maltreatment is sometimes because of the emotional, physical, verbal or sexual abuse by caregivers. BTT incorporates both attachment and damage from a caregiver in the definition of the theory. BTT includes dissociation as a diagnostic criterion for BPD. Some postulate that BTT may explain dissociation that BPD experience because dissociation is a defense mechanism against childhood trauma. High betrayal traumas have been implicated in the development of traits indicative of borderline personality disorder. This is likely due to the parents of a child with BPD also frequently having personality disorders themselves, which has a neurodevelopmental effect, through their genetics, as well as an environmental impact on the child. BPD is often linked to placidity and presenting less resistance to abuse and allowing it to continue, or even profiting off of it due to heightened threat-proxy features within BPD, such as BDSM and masochism.

Pathological Narcissism is another personality disorder in which betrayal trauma may have an impact as narcissism is functionally similar to BPD. High betrayal trauma significantly predicted both grandiose and vulnerable narcissistic dimensions.

=== Schizophrenia spectrum and other psychotic disorders ===
Dissociation is a severe symptom of betrayal trauma, and recently hallucinations have been linked to extreme cases of betrayal trauma. Research found that childhood adversity such as interpersonal trauma like betrayal trauma, bullying, and a parent's death is at increased risk for psychosis and hallucinations. There is research suggesting that individually, the betrayal trauma of childhood abuse is related to hallucinations. The long-standing intervention for the treatment of hallucinations has been medication, but new research suggests that the treatment of betrayal trauma may reduce hallucinations when childhood sexual abuse is present in the person's past.

=== Intergenerational effects ===
Individuals' levels of dissociation have been found to correlate with betrayal trauma experienced by the individual, but also with betrayal trauma experienced by the mother. As a possible mechanism for such intergenerational transmission, it has been proposed that mothers with betrayal traumas or dissociative symptoms may have more difficulty in creating a safe environment for their children.

== Treatment ==
=== Betrayal assessments ===
The Betrayal Trauma Inventory (BTI) was created to assess for BTT in patients. The inventory assesses physical, emotional and sexual abuse in childhood and/or adulthood traumas. Many of the questions have behaviorally defined events such as "did someone hold your head under water or tried to drown you before you were the age of 16". The response to these questions with "yes" can start the follow-up questions that may include age, relationship, the severity of injuries and memory of the event. These items were adapted from the Abuse and Perpetration Inventory (API). The BTI takes around 45-minutes to administer and only assesses trauma before age 16.

The Brief Betrayal Trauma Survey (BBTS) was adapted from the BTI in order to quickly assess for BTT. This survey includes 11 separate items for traumatic experiences such as sexual, physical and emotional abuse. It includes if the person was a someone close to them or an interpersonal event. This survey looks at events prior to age 18.

The Institutional Betrayal Questionnaire (IBQ), created by Smith and Freyd (2011), is a 10-item questionnaire that assesses institutional betrayal in the context of sexual assault on college campus' and identifies the level of involvement of the institution in the unwanted sexual experience and associated experiences (e.g., normalizing sexual assault, creating environments which facilitate sexual assault, and covering up incidents of sexual assault).

=== Interventions ===
Treatment for betrayal trauma is relatively new to psychology. Many advocate for evidence-based treatments tailored to specific diagnoses; others feel that betrayal trauma is unique and should be treated with an individualized approach. An article by Jennifer M. Gómez in 2016 postulated that relational-cultural therapy is a match for treating betrayal trauma. This therapy established by Jean Miller following the emerging feminist therapies suggested that the therapist should focus on the relational disconnections a client is experiencing as opposed to symptoms. Working through decontextualizing the betrayal trauma and separating self-decision-making is postulated to work better for the treatment of betrayal trauma.

In the intersection of trauma and addiction psychology, Patrick Carnes and Bonnie Phillips have used betrayal bonding and betrayal trauma within a program for healing people who are in exploitive relationships.
