= Betrayal =

Breaking or violation of a presumptive contract, trust, or confidence

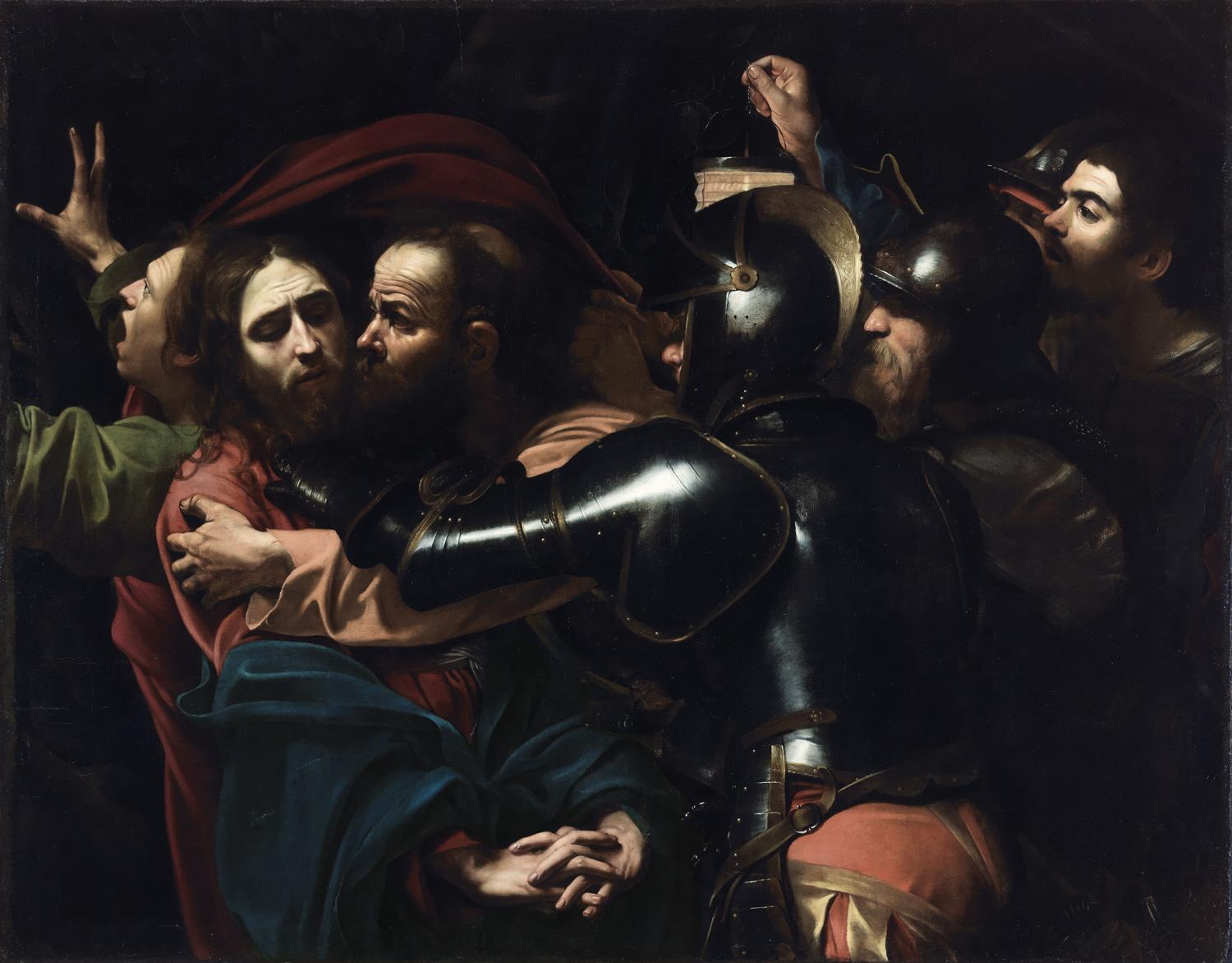
The Taking of Christ by Caravaggio (c. 1602) shows Judas betraying Jesus.

Betrayal is the breaking or violation of a presumptive contract, trust, or confidence that produces moral and psychological conflict within a relationship amongst individuals, between organizations or between individuals and organizations. Often betrayal is the act of supporting a rival group, or it is a complete break from previously decided upon or presumed norms by one party from the others. Someone who betrays others is commonly known as a traitor or betrayer.

Betrayal is a commonly used story element in fiction, sometimes used as a plot twist.

== Definition ==
Philosophers Judith Shklar and Peter Johnson, authors of The Ambiguities of Betrayal and Frames of Deceit, respectively, contend that while no clear definition of betrayal is available, betrayal is more effectively understood through literature.

=== Theoretical and practical needs ===
Rodger L. Jackson explains why a clear definition is needed:

Betrayal is both a "people" problem and a philosopher's problem. Philosophers should be able to clarify the concept of betrayal, compare and contrast it with other moral concepts, and critically assess betrayal situations. At the practical level people should be able to make honest sense of betrayal and also to temper its consequences: to handle it, not be assaulted by it. What we need is a conceptually clear account of betrayal that differentiates between genuine and merely perceived betrayal, and which also provides systematic guidance for the assessment of alleged betrayal in real life.

== Signature and consequences ==
An act of betrayal creates a constellation of negative behaviours, thoughts, and feelings in both its victims and its perpetrators. Some regard accepting the betrayal and cutting off contact as the best course of action. The alternative is to remain in contact while recognizing that the trespass can happen again, in which case the betrayed party may choose to avoid certain behaviours to decrease its severity.

== Betrayal trauma ==
Betrayal trauma has symptoms similar to posttraumatic stress disorder, although the element of amnesia and dissociation is likely to be greater.

The key difference between traditional posttraumatic stress disorder (PTSD) and betrayal trauma is that the former is historically seen as being caused primarily by fear, whereas betrayal trauma is a response to extreme anger. Another key difference is that betrayal trauma involves an individual experiencing a violation of trust by a trusted individual or institution, whereas posttraumatic stress disorder does not involve a violation from a trusted source.

== In romantic relationships ==
John Gottman's What Makes Love Last? describes betrayal as "a noxious invader, arriving with great stealth" that undermines seemingly stable romances and lies at the heart of every failing relationship, even if the couple is unaware of it. Gottman computed a betrayal metric by calculating how unwilling each partner was to sacrifice for the other and the relationship. A consistently elevated betrayal metric served as an indicator that the couple was at risk for infidelity or another serious disloyalty. Some types of betrayal in romantic relationships include sexual infidelity, conditional commitment, a nonsexual affair, lying, forming a coalition against the partner, absenteeism, disrespect, unfairness, selfishness, and breaking promises.

== Double cross ==
Double cross is a phrase meaning to deceive by double-dealing.

== Betrayal blindness ==
Betrayal blindness is the unawareness, not-knowing, and forgetting exhibited by people towards betrayal.

The term "betrayal blindness" was introduced in 1996 by Freyd, and expanded in 1999 by Freyd and then again in 2013 by Freyd and Birrell through the Betrayal Trauma Theory. This betrayal blindness may extend to betrayals that are not considered traditional traumas, such as adultery and inequities. Betrayal blindness is not exclusive to victims. Perpetrators and witnesses may also display betrayal blindness in order to preserve personal relationships, their relationships with institutions, and social systems upon which they depend.

The term "Institutional Betrayal" refers to wrongdoings perpetrated by an institution upon individuals dependent on that institution. This includes failure to prevent or respond supportively to wrongdoings by individuals (e.g. sexual assault) committed within the context of the institution.

== See also ==
- Betrayal trauma
- Creonte
- Defection
- Embezzlement
- Infidelity
- Liar
- Psalm 54
- Stab-in-the-back legend
- Treason
