= Breadcrumbing =

Form of manipulation

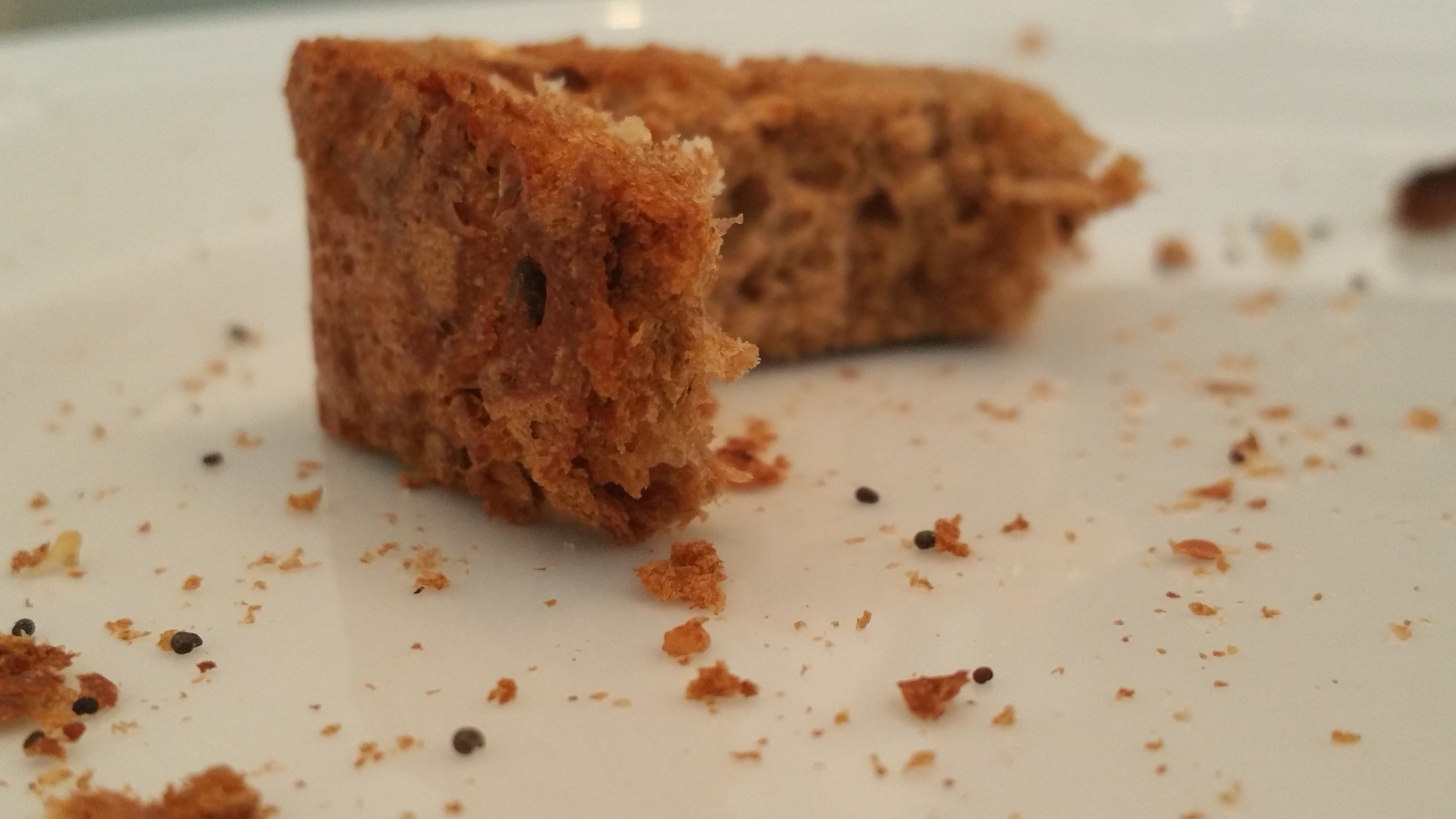
Crumbs fallen off a piece of bread

Breadcrumbing is a term used in the study of modern dating and interpersonal communication for a pattern in which one person (usually women) sends another sporadic, low-effort signals of romantic or sexual interest, such as flirtatious texts, replies to stories, or social media likes, without intending to commit to or develop into the relationship. The recipient receives enough attention to remain hopeful but not enough for the connection to progress. Psychologists, researchers, and relationship experts describe breadcrumbing behavior as a form of manipulation that may be deliberate or unintentional.

The behavior was named after the trail of breadcrumbs in the German fairy tale "Hansel and Gretel", written by the Brothers Grimm, where the trail helps lead the children back home, but the trail eventually disappears, causing them to get lost. The term circulated in popular media in 2016 and 2017 and entered academic literature in 2020, when Spanish researchers began measuring how common it is and developed a questionnaire to assess it. It is not an official psychological term or diagnosis. Later studies have examined its psychological explanation, its association with attachment insecurity and its effects on recipients, but empirical work remains limited and relies mostly on self-report surveys and small qualitative samples of young adults.

== Etymology ==
The name is a metaphor taken from the fairy tale Hansel and Gretel, in which Hansel scatters breadcrumbs to mark the way home and the crumbs are eaten by birds, leaving the children lost. The image had an earlier use in web design, where "breadcrumb navigation" is a trail of links showing which pages a visitor has passed through. Usability writers have noted that the name is strictly a misnomer, because the crumbs in the story did not help the children find their way back.

The dating sense developed alongside smartphone-era courtship. A New York Times article of 10 July 2016 about flirtation by text message discussed breadcrumbing, and researchers later drew on it for the idea that the behavior keeps a prospective partner waiting. In 2017, the term was being explained to general readers as new online dating vocabulary, with coverage in Refinery29 in January. and in PinkNews in November, the latter noting an alternative name, "Hansel and Gretelling" The first academic papers to name breadcrumbing listed it alongside ghosting, benching, haunting and slow fading as behaviors associated with dating apps.

== Definition and characteristics ==
Definitions in the literature combine minimal investment with continued ambiguity. One widely cited formulation describes sending flirtatious but non-committal messages to attract a romantic or sexual partner without expending much effort; another describes it as leading someone on by contacting them intermittently to keep them interested. Similar to ghosting behavior, breadcrumbing is an act of an avoidance of closure in relationship. However, unlike ghosting, breadcrumbing does not end contact: the manipulator continues to send messages or likes, but not often open for a relationship to develop.

Breadcrumbing can occur in almost every type of interpersonal relationship including familial dynamics, friendship, and the workplace. However, it occurs most commonly a romantic relationship, especially on an online social media platforms where fake personas can be easily created.

Commonly described features include:

- Contact without progression: plans to meet are postponed, cancelled or never made, and the recipient is often the one doing the planning.
- Low-effort gestures: Likes, memes, GIFs and greetings with no follow-up stand in for conversation.
- Delay Respond: Sometimes the breadcrumber will take hours or days to reply the message from their victim. However, they often demands an immediate reply from their victim.
- Zone-out: The manipulator will often engage in a future talk that might never happen, such as suggesting a day trip with the victim, but rarely be specific when or where will the event happen
- Reappearance: If the victim of breadcrumbing start to lose interest and try to walk away, the breadcrumber will often give the victim just enough attention to bring their interest back before vanishing again.
- Settings beyond dating: Breadcrumbing is most common in romantic contexts but has also been described in friendships and workplaces, for example when a supervisor's praise and vague promises of advancement do not materialize.

Khattar, Upadhyay and Navarro (2023) held two focus groups with nine young adults, recruited through a university psychology department in Vadodara, India, who had been breadcrumbed in the previous year. They described five interconnected patterns that tended to occur in sequence: intermittent flirting to attract the person, pretentious behavior suggesting deeper commitment, mixed signals in which words and actions did not match, avoidance of confrontation and emotional intimacy, and avoidance of commitment. Eight of the nine participants reported that a partner had given them false hopes about the future of the relationship.

== Psychological mechanism ==
The explanation most often offered for why breadcrumbing keeps a recipient interested is intermittent reinforcement. In behavioral psychology, partial reinforcement refers to rewards that are delivered only some of the time. Of the standard schedules, the variable-ratio schedule, in which a reward follows an unpredictable number of responses, produces high and steady response rates and is the most resistant to extinction; B. F. Skinner used gambling as his example. Kelly Campbell, a professor of psychology at California State University, San Bernardino, applied the principle to dating in an interview with Cable News Network (CNN). She compared breadcrumbing to a slot machine: an occasional small win keeps a player at the machine, whereas a machine that never paid out would be abandoned. Vermani said that stringing a person along keeps them from looking elsewhere for a more stable connection and leaves them hopeful and focused on the breadcrumber.

Navarro and colleagues proposed a related account to explain why breadcrumbing, but not ghosting, was associated with poorer wellbeing in their 2020 survey. Drawing on incentive theory, in which anticipation of a reward motivates behavior, they suggested that the unpredictable arrival of messages and likes creates tension in recipients in a way similar to addictive behaviors, and they called for research on whether unpredictability makes breadcrumbing more harmful than a clean break. They also proposed that sporadic responses may leave recipients in a standby state that can feel like ostracism, the experience of being ignored or excluded, and that because breadcrumbing can continue over time, recovery may be harder than after a relationship has clearly ended.

Hope also appears as an explanation from the recipient's side. In the focus groups described by Khattar and colleagues, hope for the relationship's future was the reason participants gave most often for staying in contact (four of nine), and two had expected their feelings to be reciprocated. Others cited guilt about not giving the person a chance, difficulty setting boundaries, and enjoying the short-term attention. These accounts are interpretations rather than tested mechanisms: none of the studies cited here measured reinforcement directly.

== Attachment and culture ==
Khattar, Huete and Navarro (2023) examined whether attachment insecurity is associated with engaging in breadcrumbing, as opposed to receiving it. The researchers distributed an anonymous online survey by social media, WhatsApp and email between May and August 2022, using snowball sampling in India and Spain. After participants who failed an attention check were excluded, the sample comprised 304 adults in India (mean age 22.2) and 334 in Spain (mean age 28.0), all aged 18 to 40. Participants completed a 16-item breadcrumbing scale and an eight-item measure of anxious and avoidant attachment.

Both anxious and avoidant attachment were positively associated with breadcrumbing in both countries, but the strength of each differed. In India, anxious attachment was the stronger correlate. In Spain, avoidant attachment was stronger. After controlling for age, gender, sexual orientation, education and relationship status, the full model explained about 49% of the variance in breadcrumbing in India and 35% in Spain.

The authors had expected only avoidant attachment to be positively associated with breadcrumbing and described the link with anxious attachment as unexpected. They suggested that avoidant individuals may use breadcrumbing to keep emotional distance, while anxious individuals may alternate between closeness and withdrawal in the hope that the other person will pursue them. They tentatively linked the country difference to the more collectivist culture of India and the more individualist culture of Spain, while noting that the design compares two countries rather than cultures. Limitations included snowball sampling, a cross-sectional design, self-report measures, differences in age and gender between the two samples (81% of the Indian sample were women) and the fact that only people who breadcrumb, not recipients, were studied.

== Prevalence and effects on recipients ==
Navarro and colleagues (2020) surveyed 626 Spanish adults aged 18 to 40 (303 men and 323 women) in 2019. Participants reported whether someone they regarded as a dating partner had ghosted or breadcrumbed them in the past year and completed scales measuring satisfaction with life, loneliness and helplessness. Using a criterion of at least three experiences in the year, 14.1% were classified as breadcrumbing victims, 4.8% as ghosting victims, 2.4% as victims of both and 78.8% as uninvolved; single participants reported more breadcrumbing than those with a partner. Breadcrumbing was associated with poorer scores on all three measures, whereas ghosting was not: participants who had been ghosted scored similarly to those who had experienced neither, a result the authors called surprising. They noted that people may recover once a ghosting ends and that their data could not show causation, as the survey was cross-sectional, drew on convenience and snowball sampling, and measured each behavior with a single question.

The qualitative study by Khattar, Upadhyay and Navarro describes effects in the participant's own terms. All nine reported difficulty trusting future partners, six described anxiety in later relationships, and participants also reported self-doubt, anger at themselves and a fear of repeating the same cycle. Campbell told CNN that recipients may come to accept scraps of attention as normal, which can lower their expectations of relationships.

== Responses and coping ==
Published advice on responding to breadcrumbing comes from expert commentary and participant accounts rather than intervention studies, and the sources differ in emphasis.

CNN Health reported that Campbell advises confronting the person if the relationship matters, giving them a chance to correct the behavior, and ending it if nothing changes. Vermani advised ending contact altogether, since a reappearance can draw the recipient back into the cycle. The article also quoted psychotherapist Duygu Balan on the value of therapy, and said that recognizing the pattern is the first step, followed by understanding why one accepts such treatment.

In Psychology Today, psychologist Loren Soeiro recommends being direct with the breadcrumber and discussing goals for the relationship, then proposing a specific date and time. If the other person backs out again, he writes, their intentions are probably not genuine and the recipient should priorities their own needs, which may mean disconnecting.

In the focus groups of Khattar and colleagues, participants named five strategies that they had found effective: seeking social support, working on themselves, distracting themselves, moving on from the relationship, and practical techniques such as venting or exercise. Five of nine sought support from friends, family or colleagues, all nine said that therapy was among the best ways to understand and work on oneself, and three found cutting off contact helpful.

Because breadcrumbing cycles usually leave their victims confused, anxious, and plagued by self-doubt; hence, identifying its sign and recognizing the pattern, such as not committing to future plans and actions that do not match with their word, could be the key to spotting and stopping the toxic behavior.

Behavior that could potentially break breadcrumbing cycles including:

- Confronting the breadcrumber: Be honest and give a direct conversation with the breadcrumber
- Spacing out of the conversation: Slowly spacing out from the breadcrumber and end the relationship if necessary
- Obstructing: Preventing the breadcrumber from receiving something they want
- Ghosting
- Prioritizing

== See also ==
- DARVO
