= Sameer Hinduja =

American social scientist

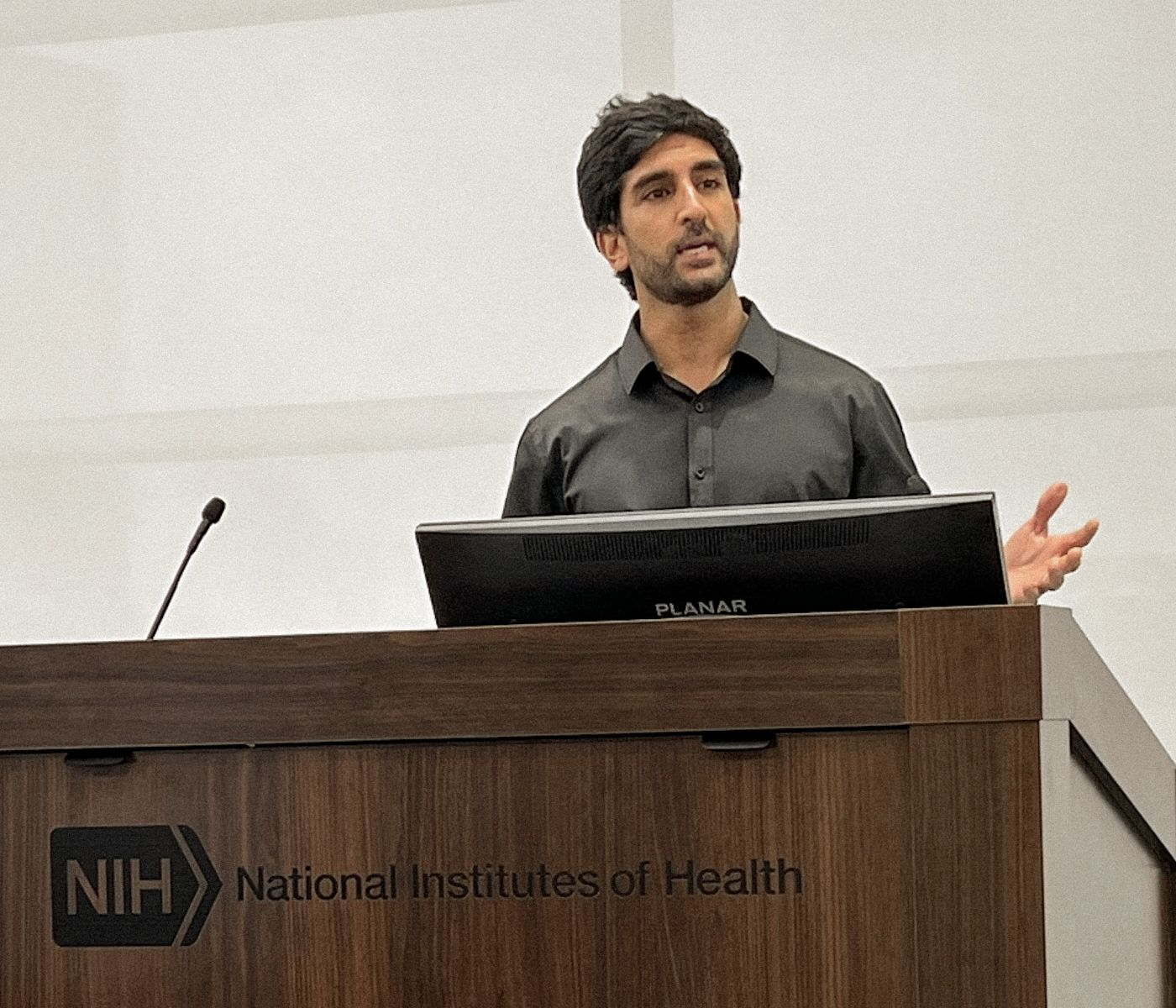
Dr. Sameer Hinduja presenting on "The influence of Technology and Digital Media on Socioemotional Development and Mental Health" at the National Institutes of Health in Bethesda, Maryland in 2024

Sameer Hinduja is an American social scientist. He serves as Professor of Criminology at Florida Atlantic University and co-director of the Cyberbullying Research Center. He has served as a Fulbright Specialist Scholar at Dublin City University and currently serves as Faculty Associate at the Berkman Klein Center at Harvard University. Hinduja is also the co-founder and Co-Editor-in-Chief of the International Journal of Bullying Prevention. He is an international expert in cyberbullying, sexting, sextortion, online and offline dating violence, digital self-harm, and related forms of online harm among youth. He has written eight books, including Bullying Today: Bullet Points and Best Practices, Bullying Beyond the Schoolyard: Preventing and Responding to Cyberbullying, and School Climate 2.0. His research publications have been cited over 25,000 times, and have appeared in such outlets as Journal of Adolescent Health, Journal of Youth and Adolescence, Journal of Interpersonal Violence, Computers in Human Behavior, and New Media and Society. Topics studied include empathy, psychological resilience, parenting, social and emotional learning, school climate, and well-being.

== Education ==
Hinduja grew up in Florida and received his bachelor's degree in Criminal Justice (minoring in Legal Studies) from the University of Central Florida. Then he attended Michigan State University where he received his master's degree in Criminal Justice before earning his Ph.D. in criminal justice (cognate: Computer Science).

== Professional life ==
Hinduja has given talks nationally and internationally on a number of topics that deal with the prevention of, and response to, youth technology abuse and misuse, and focuses on supporting youth mental health and well-being through research-based practices. Specific events include keynotes or keynote panels for the RSA, the National Institute of Health, UNESCO, the World Bank, the National PTA, the World Anti-Bullying Forum, the International Bullying Prevention Association, Australia's eSafety Office, and the Association for Middle Level Education. Hinduja has also testified in 2018 on cyberbullying and school safety in front of the United States Attorney General and the Department of Education, Health and Human Services, and Homeland Security and has presented on School Safety and Violence Prevention at a 2015 Congressional Briefing. His work involves original data collection from tweens and teens primarily in the United States but also across the world, and is also informed by partnerships with non-profits, media companies, and social media platforms. With his research partner Dr. Justin W. Patchin, he co-directs the Cyberbullying Research Center. The mission of the center is to contribute evidence-based insight into the challenges children confront online every day. The center's work has empowered youth and adults around the world to get the most out of their online experiences by minimizing potential harms and maximizing benefits.

== Publications ==
=== Academic papers ===
- Patchin, J. W. & Hinduja, S. (2024). Addressing Youth Sexting Through Rational Legislation and Education. Journal of Adolescent Health, 74 (4), 530–532.
- Patchin, J. W. & Hinduja, S. (2024). Adolescent Digital Self-Harm Over Time: Prevalence and Perspectives. Journal of School Violence, 23 (4), 542–554.
- Patchin, J. W. & Hinduja, S. (2024). The Nature and Extent of Youth Sextortion: Legal Implications and Directions for Future Research. Behavioral Sciences & the Law, 42 (4), 401–416.
- Patchin, J. W. & Hinduja, S. (2023). Cyberbullying Among Asian American Youth Before and During the COVID-19 Pandemic. Journal of School Health, 93 (1), 82–87.
- Patchin, J. W., Hinduja, S., & Meldrum, R. C. (2023). Digital Self-Harm and Suicidality Among Adolescents. Child and Adolescent Mental Health, 28 (1), 52–59.
- Hinduja, S. & Patchin, J. W. (2022). Bias-Based Cyberbullying Among Early Adolescents: Associations with Cognitive and Affective Empathy. Journal of Early Adolescence, 42 (9) 1204–1235.
- Hinduja, S. & Patchin, J. W. (2022). Bullying and Cyberbullying Offending: The Influence of Six Parenting Dimensions Among US Youth. Journal of Child and Family Studies, 31, 1454–1473.
- Meldrum, R. C., Young, J. Patchin, J. W., & Hinduja, S. (2021). Bullying Victimization, Negative Emotions, and Digital Self-Harm: Testing a Theoretical Model of Indirect Effects. Deviant Behavior, 43 (3), 303–321.
- Patchin, J. W. & Hinduja, S. (2021). Cyberbullying Among Tweens in the United States: Prevalence, Impact, and Helping Behaviors. Journal of Early Adolescence, 42 (3), 414–430.
- Lee, C., Patchin, J. W., Hinduja, S., Dischinger, A. (2020). Bullying and Delinquency: The Impact of Anger and Frustration. Violence and Victims, 35 (4), 503–523.
- Hinduja, S. & Patchin, J. W. (2020). Digital Dating Abuse Among a National Sample of U.S. Youth. Journal of Interpersonal Violence, 36 (23-24), 11088–11108.
- Patchin, J. W. & Hinduja, S. (2020). It's Time to Teach Safe Sexting. Journal of Adolescent Health, 66 (2), 140–143.
- Patchin, J. W. & Hinduja, S. (2019). The Nature and Extent of Sexting Among Middle and High School Students. Archives of Sexual Behavior, 48, 2333–2343.
- Hinduja, S. & Patchin, J. W. (2019). Connecting Adolescent Suicide to the Severity of Bullying and Cyberbullying. Journal of School Violence, 18:3, 333–346.
- Hinduja, S. & Patchin, J. W. (2018). Deterring Teen Bullying: Assessing the Impact of Perceived Punishment From Police, Schools, and Parents. Youth Violence and Juvenile Justice, 16 (2), 190–207.
- Patchin, J. W. & Hinduja, S. (2018). Sextortion Among Adolescents: Results from a National Survey of U.S. Youth. Sexual Abuse: A Journal of Research and Treatment, 32 (1), 30–54.
- Patchin, J. W. & Hinduja, S. (2017). Digital Self-Harm. Journal of Adolescent Health, 61, 761–766.
- Hinduja, S. & Patchin, J. W. (2017). Cultivating Youth Resilience to Prevent Bullying and Cyberbullying Victimization. Child Abuse & Neglect, 73, 51–62.
- Patchin, J. W. & Hinduja, S. (2013). Cyberbullying among Adolescents: Implications for Empirical Research. Journal of Adolescent Health, 53(4), 431–432.
- Sabella, R. A., Patchin, J. W., & Hinduja, S. (2013). Cyberbullying myths and realities. Computers in Human Behavior, 29(6), 2703–2711.
- Hinduja, S. & Kooi, B. (2013). Curtailing Cyber and Information Security Vulnerabilities through Situational Crime Prevention. Security Journal, 26(4):383-402.
- Hinduja, S. & Patchin, J. W. (2013). Social Influences on Cyberbullying Behaviors Among Middle and High School Students. Journal of Youth and Adolescence, 42 (5), 711–722.

=== Books ===
Hinduja, S. & Patchin, J. W. (2024). Bullying Beyond the Schoolyard: Preventing and Responding to Cyberbullying. Thousand Oaks, CA: Sage Publications (Corwin Press). 3rd Edition. ISBN 1071916564

Patchin, J.W. & Hinduja, S. (2016). Bullying Today: Bullet Points and Best Practices. Thousand Oaks, CA: Sage Publications. ISBN 978-1-5063-3597-1

Hinduja, S. & Patchin, J. W. (2015). Bullying Beyond the Schoolyard: Preventing and Responding to Cyberbullying. Thousand Oaks, CA: Sage Publications (Corwin Press). 2nd Edition. ISBN 1483349934

Patchin, J. W. & Hinduja, S. (2014). Words Wound: Delete Cyberbullying and Make Kindness Go Viral. Minneapolis, MN: Free Spirit Publishing. ISBN 978-1575424514

Patchin, J. W. & Hinduja, S. (2014). A Leader's Guide to Words Wound. Minneapolis, MN: Free Spirit Publishing.

Hinduja, S. & Patchin, J. W. (2012). School Climate 2.0: Preventing Cyberbullying and Sexting One Classroom at a Time. Thousand Oaks, CA: Sage Publications (Corwin Press). ISBN 1412997836

Patchin, J. W. & Hinduja, S. (2012). Cyberbullying Prevention and Response: Expert Perspectives. New York: Routledge. ISBN 0415892376,

Hinduja, S. & Patchin, J. W. (2009). Bullying Beyond the Schoolyard: Preventing and Responding to Cyberbullying. Thousand Oaks, CA: Sage Publications (Corwin Press). ISBN 9781412966887

Hinduja, S. (2006). Music Piracy and Crime Theory. New York: LFB Scholarly, Inc. ISBN 1593321244

=== TEDx Talks ===
- Single-Minded Focus, TEDx, Florida Atlantic University
- The Lost Art of Listening, TEDx, Florida Atlantic University
- Comparing Ourselves to Others, TEDx, Florida Atlantic University

== Awards and honors ==
- Fulbright Specialist Award Recipient, 2017
- Auburn University's Global Anti-Bullying Hero Award, 2015
- Florida Atlantic University's Researcher of the Year Award, 2015, 2010
- Children's Wireless Safety Achievement Award from the Wireless Foundation, 2014
- Michigan State University's Distinguished Young Alumni Award, 2014
- Michigan State University's School of Criminal Justice Wall of Fame inductee, 2012
