= Moral injury =

Injury to an individual's moral conscience and values

A moral injury is a traumatic experience emerging from the witnessing of or participation in an act of perceived moral transgression on the part of themselves or others. It produces profound feelings of guilt or shame, moral disorientation, and societal alienation. In some cases it may cause a sense of betrayal and anger toward colleagues, commanders, the organization, politics, or society at large.

Moral injury is most often studied in the context of military personnel, and is studied in occupational groups that frequently encounter "high-stakes" situations. It has been studied in healthcare workers (especially during the COVID-19 pandemic), prison officers, humanitarian aid workers, human trafficking survivors, people involved in accidents, and people who have been raped or abused.

== Definition ==
Psychiatrist Jonathan Shay and colleagues coined the term moral injury to describe experiences where someone who holds legitimate authority has betrayed what is morally right in a high-stakes situation. The concept of moral injury emphasizes the psychological, social, cultural, and spiritual aspects of trauma.

According to the International Centre for Moral Injury, it "involves a profound sense of broken trust in ourselves, our leaders, governments and institutions to act in just and morally 'good' ways" and the experience of "sustained and enduring negative moral emotions – guilt, shame, contempt and anger – that results from the betrayal, violation or suppression of deeply held or shared moral values."

The US Department of Veterans Affairs uses the term moral injury to describe the experiences of military veterans who have witnessed or perpetrated actions in combat that transgressed their deeply held moral beliefs and expectations.

== History ==
In 1984, the term moral distress was first conceptualized by philosopher Andrew Jameton in his book on nursing issues, Nursing Practice: The Ethical Issues to describe the psychological conflict nurses experienced during "ethical dilemmas". He wrote that "moral distress arises when one knows the right thing to do, but institutional constraints make it nearly impossible to pursue the right course of action."

In the 1990s, the term moral injury was coined by psychiatrist Jonathan Shay and colleagues based upon numerous narratives presented by military/veteran patients given their perception of injustice as a result of leadership malpractice. Shay's definition of moral injury had three components: "Moral injury is present when (i) there has been a betrayal of what is morally right, (ii) by someone who holds legitimate authority and (iii) in a high-stakes situation." As of 2002, Shay defined moral injury as stemming from the "betrayal of 'what's right' in a high-stakes situation by someone who holds power."

In 2009, the term moral injury was modified by Brett Litz and colleagues as "perpetrating, failing to prevent, or bearing witness to acts that transgress deeply held moral beliefs and expectations may be deleterious in the long term, emotionally, psychologically, behaviorally, spiritually, and socially" (2009, p. 695). According to Litz et al., the term moral injury had been developed in response to the inadequacy of mental health diagnoses, such as post-traumatic stress disorder (PTSD), to encapsulate the moral anguish service members were experiencing after returning home from war. Unlike PTSD's focus on fear-related symptoms, moral injury focuses on symptoms related to guilt, shame, anger, and disgust. The shame that many individuals face as a result of moral injury may predict symptoms of posttraumatic stress disorder.

As of 2017, no systematic reviews or meta-analyses exist on the construct of moral injury, although a literature review of the various definitions since the inception of moral injury has been undertaken, as well as psychological and interdisciplinary literature reviews of how moral injury develops and the factors involved.

In 2019, researchers surveyed previous literature and expertise to compile a list of events that could distress civilians at a level consistent with moral injury. Examples include causing a car accident or experiencing sexual assault, but researchers emphasize that not everyone will respond to an event in the same way.

In the early 2020s, moral injury emerged as one of the explanations for the wave of employee resignations across industries. In particular, Ludmila Praslova proposed that moral injury might be a better explanation for a segment of resignations and employee distress than burnout, and provided suggestions for organizational-level interventions.

In 2022, researchers identified associations between moral injury and complex post-traumatic stress disorder (CPTSD). CPTSD's disturbances in self-organisation constitute the three additional clusters of symptoms distinguishing it from PTSD (i.e. emotional dysregulations, interpersonal difficulties, negative self-concepts around beliefs of worthlessness or failure and related guilt or shame). Veterans with possible CPTSD reported greater moral injury related to perpetration- and betrayal-based events compared to those with and without possible PTSD and findings suggesting the special relevance of moral injury among veterans with CPTSD.

== Military ==
To understand the development of the construct of moral injury, it is necessary to examine the history of violence and the psychological consequences. Throughout history, humans have been killing each other, and have shown great reluctance in doing so. Literature on warfare emphasizes the moral anguish soldiers feel in combat, from modern military service members to ancient warriors. Ethical and moral challenges are inherent to warfare. Soldiers in the line of duty may witness catastrophic suffering and severe cruelty, causing their fundamental beliefs about humanity and their worldview to be shaken.

Service members who are deployed into war zones are usually exposed to death, injury, and violence. Military service members represent the population with the highest risk of developing post-traumatic stress disorder. PTSD was first included in the third edition of the Diagnostic and Statistical Manual of Mental Disorders, the manual classifying mental health disorders published by the American Psychiatric Association, to begin to address the symptoms that Vietnam veterans exhibited after their wartime experiences.

As PTSD has developed as a diagnosis, it requires that individuals are either directly exposed to death, threatened death, serious injury, or sexual violence, witness it in person, learn about it occurring indirectly to a close relative or friend, or are repeatedly exposed to aversive details of traumatic events. PTSD includes four symptom clusters, including intrusion, avoidance, and negative mood and thoughts, and changes in arousal and reactivity. Individuals with PTSD may experience intrusive thoughts as they re-experience the traumatic events, as well as avoiding stimuli that reminds them of the traumatic event, and have increasingly negative thoughts and moods. Additionally, individuals with PTSD may exhibit irritable or aggressive, self-destructive behavior, and hypervigilance, amongst other arousal-related symptoms.

Moral injury can also be experienced by warriors who have been transgressed against. The injury may in those cases, which are often about transgressions by the soldier and others (e.g. the commander) at the same time, include a sense of betrayal and anger. For example, when one goes to war believing that the purpose of the war is to eradicate weapons of mass destruction, but finds that not to be the case, or when the soldier is sent to war with an impossible mandate rendering him powerless in the face of human suffering, the soldier can experience moral injury. Those who have seen and experienced death, mayhem, destruction, and violence and have had their worldviews shattered – the sanctity of life, safety, love, health, peace, etc. – can also suffer moral injury.

The exposure to violence during war times puts the military and veteran population at a higher risk of developing moral injury. According to statistics collected in 2003, 32 percent of American service members deployed to Iraq and to Afghanistan were responsible for the death of an enemy, 60 percent had witnessed both women and children who were either ill or wounded to whom they were unable to provide aid, and 20 percent reported being responsible for the death of a non-combatant.

Similar work has been conducted in a Canadian military context – out of Canadian Armed Forces personnel deployed to the mission to Afghanistan, more than half endorsed a traumatic event that was conceptually linked to moral injury. Specifically, 43 percent saw ill or injured women or children who they were unable to help; 7 percent felt responsible for the death of Canadian or allied personnel, and 38 percent had difficulty distinguishing between combatants and non-combatants. Controlling for other fear-based deployment-related stressors, exposure to such potentially morally injurious events has been related to increased prevalence of PTSD and depression in military personnel.

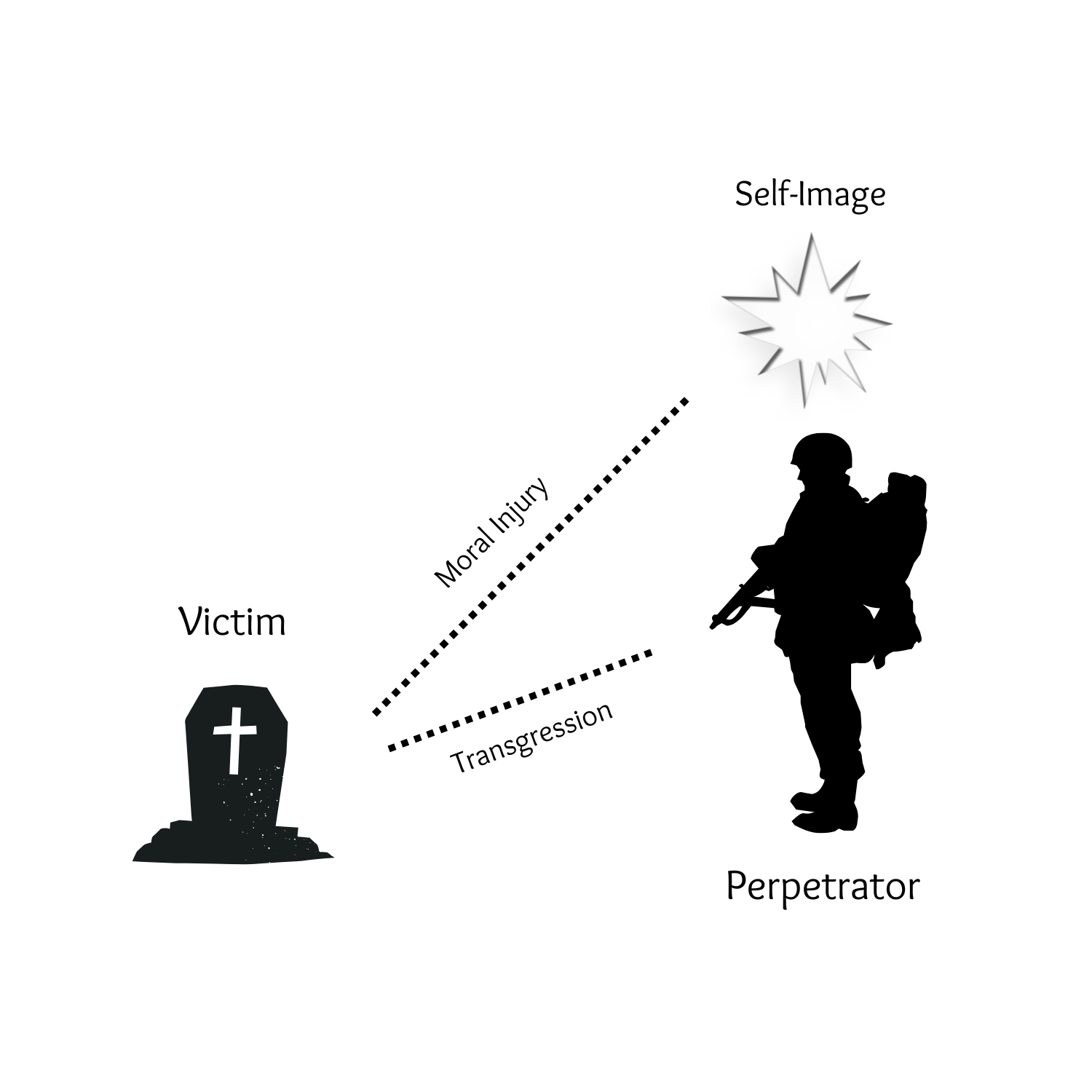
Soldiers' choices during war can result in psychological harm.

During times of war a service member's personal ethical code may clash with the decisions they are expected to make or the behavior they are expected to display. Approximately 27 percent of deployed soldiers have reported having an ethical dilemma to which they did not know how to respond. Research has shown that longer and more frequent deployments can result in an increase in unethical behaviors on the battlefield. This is problematic considering deployment lengths increased for the war in Iraq and Afghanistan.

During times of war, the military promotes an ethical pardon on the killing of an enemy, going against the typical moral code for many service members. While a service member is deployed, killing of the enemy is expected and often rewarded. Despite this, when a service member returns home, the socio-cultural expectations are largely different from when they were deployed. The ethical code back home has not changed, making the transition from deployment to home difficult for some service members. This clash between personal ethics and the ethics and expectations of the military can further increase a service member's deep-seated feelings of shame and guilt for their actions abroad.

== Healthcare professionals ==
Moral distress among healthcare professionals was first conceptualized in 1984 by Andrew Jameton. The concept was gradually explored over the subsequent 30 years in both nursing and veteran literature, though, as above, the definitions were slightly different. In the healthcare literature, moral injury is the accumulation of negative effects by continued exposure to morally distressing situations. In 2000 the concept of moral distress being generated by systemic issues was called "the ethical canary" to draw attention to the sensation of moral distress signaling a need for systemic change.

Situations in which moral distress is experienced may be caused by:

- Hierarchical imbalances, such as a nurse being unable to challenge a decision made by a senior physician
- Legal requirements, such as a necessary treatment being banned
- Resource limitations, such as needing to triage patients while knowing that some will die as a result

Moral injury can occur among physicians and other care providers which affect their mental health and well-being. The concept of moral injury in healthcare is the expansion of the discussion around compassion fatigue and burnout.

Physicians in the United States were caught in situations that prevented them from doing what they perceive is the right course of action, i.e. taking care of the patient well. Instead, they were caught in double and triple and quadruple binds between their obligations of electronic health records, their own student loans, the requirements for patient load through the hospital and number of procedures performed. Often, physicians are trained to the gold standard but due to institutional double-binds, cannot actually execute that best-in-class treatment.

Nurses, particularly those who work in intensive-care settings, are highly likely to experience moral injury or burnout. The injury stems from the proximity to secondary trauma and the inability provide the optimal level of care.

Moral injury has been studied in medical students working within the National Health Service (NHS). NHS doctors come to psychological harm as a result of not being able to give patients the care that they need in an under-resourced NHS.

During the COVID-19 pandemic in 2020 and 2021, healthcare workers in the United States were faced with decisions like rationing care while hospital policy and insurance constraints remain, without support or training on how to psychologically process the toll these decisions can take. Driven by changes in health care reimbursement structures, systems were "optimized" to the point that they were continually running at what felt like full capacity, with precious little slack to accommodate minor surges, much less one the magnitude of a global pandemic. As such, COVID-19 exacerbated an already deeply challenged system. The United Nations Special Rapporteur stated that mental interventions should be geared towards removing barriers to well-being. Support for realization of civil, political, economic, social, and cultural rights may be the results of mental health interventions.

== First responders ==
The concept of moral injury has more recently also been discovered among police, and likely exists among firefighters as well and other forms as first responders work and should include such Emergency Medical Services, legal defenders/lawyers, and Child/Adult Protective Services. Professions with non-human subjects such as veterinarians are also beginning to be studied.

== Prisons ==
An ex-prison official "has used the term 'moral injury' to describe the experience of staff working in unsafe, dangerous prisons: alienated from their own morality or professional standards, they try to get to the end of each day without losing a life, but suffer the consequences in elevated rates of suicide, alcohol addiction, breakdown, or domestic violence."

Moral injury in prisons could include causing or witnessing injury to detainees with undue force, feeling powerless to prevent assaults or detainee suicides, and "may include having to follow specific correctional procedures which the individual believes are unethical within the specific scenario". A study found that some Canadian correctional officers "felt they had no means to "discipline"" prisoners who harmed others in prison, leading to forced acts of omission and potential moral injury.

=== Detainees ===
Detainees "may be especially vulnerable to moral injury-related mental health difficulties". Societal shame attached to crimes like murder or sexual assault may cause moral injury. Being found guilty by a jury or the court of public opinion can be morally injurious. Crimes committed while having diminished capacity, while mentally impaired, being voluntarily under the influence of substances, or following grooming may lead to internal conflict and moral injury if the offender feels their actions were wrong.

Detainees may avoid care for moral injury because of stigma, mistrust of healthcare providers, or a fear of self-incrimination.

=== Executions ===
Executions can cause prison staff and executioners to experience psychological stress similar to veterans after war.

== Psychology ==
Brett Litz and colleagues define moral injury as "perpetrating, failing to prevent, bearing witness to, or learning about acts that transgress deeply held moral beliefs and expectations." Litz and colleagues focus on the cognitive, behavioral, and emotional aspects of moral injury, positing that cognitive dissonance occurs after a perceived moral transgression resulting in stable internal global attributions of blame, followed by the experience of shame, guilt, or anxiety, causing the individual to withdraw from others. The result is increased risk of suicide due to demoralization, self-harming, and self-handicapping behaviors.

Psychological risk factors which make an individual more prone to moral injury include neuroticism and shame-proneness. Protective factors include self-esteem, forgiving supports, and belief in the just-world fallacy.

== Sociology ==
Anthropologist Tine Molendijk's transdisciplinary research has shown that as unresolved conflicts at the political level create potentially morally injurious situations for soldiers on the ground, "experiences of institutional betrayal" and "a resultant search for reparations" by veterans can also be part of moral injury. She further demonstrates that not only public condemnation of veterans, but public heroification, too, may contribute to moral injury, given that both are generally experienced by veterans as alienating distortions of their war experience, meaning that both may entail an "injustice" being done to the experience.

As the causes of moral injury lie not only in the individual but also at the organizational, political and societal levels, Molendijk further argues, solutions should be sought at these levels as well. The practical implications of a holistic approach to moral injury, for instance, include that we need 'a more elaborate moral vocabulary, the decision-making framework of the Just War Tradition, and purification and reintegration practices'.

== Theology ==
Rita Nakashima Brock and Gabriella Lettini emphasize moral injury as "...souls in anguish, not a psychological disorder." This occurs when veterans struggle with a lost sense of humanity after transgressing deeply held moral beliefs. The Soul Repair Center at Brite Divinity School is dedicated to addressing moral injury from this spiritual perspective.

Moral injuries can cause religious struggles, such as feeling punished by God or alienated.

== Treatment ==
While moral injury can be experienced by people other than military service members, research has paid special attention to moral injury in military populations. Seeking professional mental health help for moral injury may present with some challenges, particularly for military personnel. Moral injury is frequently associated with socially withdrawing emotions, such as guilt and shame. These emotions may further reduce the likelihood of individuals reaching out for help in the fear of being rejected or judged by others. Additionally, military personnel may be hesitant to seek help due to actual or perceived career repercussions. Recent research on this topic showed that among active deployed military personnel, those who were exposed to potentially morally injurious experiences were more likely to avoid military mental health services and instead seek help from a professional in a civilian health care system.

According to Shay, the process of recovery should consist of "purification" through the "communalization of trauma". Shay places special importance on communication through artistic means of expression. Moral injury could only be absolved when "the trauma survivor... [is] permitted and empowered to voice their experience....". Fully coming "home" would mean integration into a culture where one is accepted, valued and respected, has a sense of place, purpose, and social support.

According to Litz for this to occur, there needed to be openness on the part of civilians to hear the veterans' experiences without prejudice. The culture in the military emphasizes a moral and ethical code that normalizes both killing and violence in times of war. In 2009, Litz and colleagues hypothesized a modified version of cognitive-behavioral therapy (CBT), that addresses three key areas of moral injury: "life-threat trauma, traumatic loss, and moral injury Marines from the Iraq and Afghanistan wars". Despite this, decisions made by service members who engage in killing or violence through this cultural lens would still experience psychological and spiritual impact.

It is hypothesized that treating the underlying shame associated with service member's symptoms of PTSD is necessary and it has been shown that allowing feelings of shame to go untreated can have deleterious effects. This can make the identification of moral injury in a service member difficult because shame tends to increase slowly over time. Shame has been linked to complications such as interpersonal violence, depression, and suicide.

Neurological research suggests that there are differences in how physical threat and moral injury affect the brain. In 2015, Gaudet and colleagues wrote that treatment interventions are lacking and new treatment interventions specific to moral injury are necessary, and that it was not enough to treat moral injury in the same way that depression or PTSD are commonly treated. Treatments for PTSD have been described as "backwards-acting" in that they tend to focus on reframing negative thoughts about a past trauma.

For someone who has violated their moral code by doing or failing to do something, such reframing may not be appropriate or effective. For example, many front line health workers during the COVID-19 pandemic have had to deal with extremely stressful situations in which they were unable to provide care at a level which they considered appropriate. Those experiencing moral injury may be better served by "forward-looking" treatment that supports "adaptive disclosure", combining acceptance of responsibility for their past choices with a focus on their ability to contribute in the future, and where appropriate, steps towards reparation.

Treating moral injury has been described as "soul repair" due to the nature of moral anguish. "Spiritually integrated" therapies for moral injury that deal with feelings of guilt and shame often draw upon religious traditions. In spite of the lack of research on the treatment of moral injury, factors such as humility, gratitude, respect and compassion have shown to either be protective or provide for hope.

In the 11th century, soldiers involved in the Norman conquest of England, took part in the church administered Ermenfrid Penitential, to atone for, and mentally process the violence they participated in.

== Moral injury vs. PTSD ==
Post-traumatic stress disorder (PTSD) and moral injury are related but distinct constructs, each associated with significant psychological distress arising from exposure to adverse events. PTSD is a well-defined psychiatric disorder that develops following exposure to actual or threatened death, serious injury, or sexual violence, and is primarily characterized by fear-based symptoms, including intrusive recollections, hyperarousal, avoidance, and negative alterations in cognition and mood. The underlying mechanism is typically linked to experiences of intense fear, helplessness, or horror in life-threatening situations.

Moral injury, by contrast, refers to the psychological, emotional, and spiritual distress that results from actions, or the failure to act, which violate an individual's deeply held moral or ethical beliefs. Rather than fear, moral injury is principally associated with guilt, shame, remorse, and a sense of moral disorientation or loss of integrity.

Although PTSD and moral injury can co-occur, particularly in high-risk contexts such as military combat, they differ in both etiology and therapeutic approach. Evidence-based treatments for PTSD, such as cognitive behavioral therapy (CBT) and prolonged exposure therapy, focus on processing traumatic memories and reducing conditioned fear responses. In contrast, interventions targeting moral injury emphasize moral repair, including processes such as acknowledgment of wrongdoing, self-forgiveness, making amends, and the restoration of a coherent moral identity.

While standard PTSD treatments may alleviate some overlapping symptoms, they do not directly address the moral and existential dimensions central to moral injury. Consequently, specialized therapeutic approaches have been developed to address these aspects, often incorporating elements of narrative reconstruction, ethical reflection, and reconciliation.

== Long-term effects on mental health ==
Long-term moral injury can harm mental health and cause psychological issues. People with moral injuries often feel guilty, ashamed, and use self-blame, feelings which can make daily life difficult. These emotions can lead to depression, recreational drug use, and thoughts of suicide. Moral injuries also relate to emotional numbness and relationship issues. People with moral injuries often trust others less and feel alone. It is suggested that early spotting and treatment can stop moral injury from developing conditions like complex PTSD or personality disorders (Litz et al., 2009). As moral injury is being researched, mental health experts are starting to focus on treatments made just for it, to heal and rebuild how they see themselves and the world. Their experiences can often break this view.
