= Cyberbullying Research Center =

US research center

- Abbreviation: CRC
- Formation: 2005
- Founders: Sameer Hinduja; Justin W. Patchin
- Type: Academic research center
- Location(s): Jupiter, Florida (Hinduja); Eau Claire, Wisconsin (Patchin)
- Website: cyberbullying.org

The Cyberbullying Research Center (CRC) is an academic research initiative co-directed by Sameer Hinduja, a professor of criminology at Florida Atlantic University and Faculty Associate at the Berkman Klein Center for Internet & Society at Harvard University, and Justin W. Patchin, a professor of criminal justice at the University of Wisconsin–Eau Claire. Founded in 2005, it produces peer-reviewed research, educational resources, and policy guidance on cyberbullying, sextortion, digital self-harm, and other online harms affecting young people, including risks associated with artificial intelligence, social chatbots, and metaverse environments. The Center's website serves as a clearinghouse for parents, educators, mental health professionals, law enforcement officers, and youth.

== History ==
Hinduja and Patchin began collaborating on cyberbullying research in 2002 and launched the Center in 2005. Their early work included one of the first large-scale empirical studies of cyberbullying among American adolescents, published in Youth Violence and Juvenile Justice in 2006. The pair defined cyberbullying as "willful and repeated harm inflicted through the use of computers, cell phones, and other electronic devices," a definition that has been cited in peer-reviewed studies across criminology, psychology, education, and law.

In March 2011, the Center participated in the White House Conference on Bullying Prevention convened by President Barack Obama and First Lady Michelle Obama. Patchin served on an expert panel alongside researchers from Johns Hopkins University and the University of Connecticut, and the Center contributed a white paper on cyberbullying for the event.

In February 2015, Hinduja presented at a Congressional Briefing on School Safety and Violence Prevention held in the Cannon House Office Building. The briefing was co-organized by the Center for Evidence-Based Crime Policy at George Mason University and WestEd.

== Research ==
As of 2025, the Center has collected survey data from approximately 40,000 young people across multiple nationally representative samples in the United States. While its early work focused on cyberbullying, the Center's published research has since expanded to cover digital self-harm among adolescents, youth sextortion, the relationship between cyberbullying and suicidal ideation, and risks associated with metaverse environments. More recent work addresses the use of artificial intelligence by and against young people, including AI-generated deepfake imagery used to harass peers and the use of conversational AI chatbots for advice, companionship, and romantic interaction.

In a 2026 national study published in the Journal of Adolescence, the Center reported that 60 percent of United States teenagers had used a conversational AI chatbot and that nearly half of those users described at least one harmful interaction, including manipulation, exposure to inappropriate content, and the blurring of human and machine relationships. The study drew coverage from outlets including U.S. News & World Report.

Hinduja and Patchin have co-authored eight books on cyberbullying, online safety, and youth technology use. Bullying Beyond the Schoolyard: Preventing and Responding to Cyberbullying (Corwin Press, 2009) was named Educator Book of the Year by ForeWord Reviews. A third edition was published in 2023. The Center also maintains a publicly accessible database of United States cyberbullying and sexting laws organized by state.

In connection with the work of the Center, Hinduja co-founded the International Journal of Bullying Prevention, a peer-reviewed journal published by Springer Nature. As of 2025, the journal holds a CiteScore of 5.7 and is ranked in the first quartile (Q1) in Scopus for Social Sciences and Social Psychology.

== Legal and legislative citations ==
In February 2021, the Center filed an amicus curiae brief with the Supreme Court of the United States in Mahanoy Area School District v. B.L. (No. 20-255), a case addressing whether public schools may regulate students' off-campus online speech. The Center was listed as a named party on the official docket. The Court issued an 8–1 ruling in June 2021.

The Center's research has been cited by name in the text of multiple United States House of Representatives resolutions. H.Res.1013 (118th Congress) and H.Res.128 and H.Res.1052 (119th Congress), each designating February as "National Teen Dating Violence Awareness and Prevention Month," cite the Center's data on digital dating abuse among adolescents in their "Whereas" clauses.

The Center's state-by-state cyberbullying law database and its co-directors' empirical research have been cited in legal scholarship analyzing student speech, school authority, and the constitutionality of cyberbullying statutes.

== Recognition ==
The Center is listed as a named resource on SchoolSafety.gov, the federal interagency school safety clearinghouse administered by the Department of Homeland Security, Department of Education, Department of Justice, and Department of Health and Human Services. The National Science Foundation featured the Center in a news article on cyberbullying research, identifying Hinduja and Patchin by their roles as CRC co-directors.

The Center's research and resources have been referenced by the American Psychological Association, PACER's National Bullying Prevention Center, the National Children's Alliance, and the Joan Ganz Cooney Center at Sesame Workshop.

Hinduja and Patchin have been identified as CRC co-directors in reporting by NPR, The New York Times, and The Washington Post. In a January 2026 Associated Press report carried by PBS on AI-generated deepfake imagery in schools, Hinduja was quoted in his capacity as CRC co-director on how schools should respond.

== See also ==
- Cyberbullying
- Sameer Hinduja
- Sextortion
- Online harassment
- Digital self-harm
- Mahanoy Area School District v. B.L.
