= Emotional dumping =

Sharing traumatic experiences without appropriate boundaries

Emotional dumping, also called trauma dumping, is a psychological phenomenon that was coined in the 2020s, describing the act of sharing traumatic or otherwise emotionally intense experiences without appropriate boundaries or consideration of the consent of the listeners. It stands in contrast with venting, which involves sharing difficult experiences and emotions in a mutually considerate and beneficial manner, whereas emotional dumping represents a distinct pattern of inappropriate or overwhelming disclosure possibly straining relationships or worsening the mental health of both parties.

== Description ==
Emotional dumping occurs when an individual shares intense personal traumas or emotionally intense thoughts and experiences without considering the listener's capacity to process such information. This behavior differs fundamentally from healthy venting or therapeutic sharing because of its intense, frequent or graphic nature and the lack of consideration for the recipient's emotional state or readiness.

Emotional dumping can manifest through several distinctive behavioral patterns. Individuals frequently revisit the same traumatic narrative, often including graphic and explicit details that may disturb listeners. The behavior typically involves sharing deeply personal trauma in inappropriate settings or with casual acquaintances who lack the context or relationship to process such information effectively. People who emotionally dump can possibly demonstrate minimal interest in others' perspectives or experiences, creating one-sided conversations that focus exclusively on their own emotions.

Some individuals who engage in emotional dumping may strategically select listeners who may feel obligated to provide support due to social or professional relationships. In such cases, the person engaging in trauma dumping typically shows little reciprocity in emotional exchanges, rarely inquiring about others' experiences or allowing space for mutual sharing. This can lead to codependency in other aspects of the relationship.

Social media platforms have become common venues for this behavior, where individuals post detailed accounts of traumatic experiences without considering their audience's capacity to handle such information.

== Causes ==
Mental health professionals recognize several underlying factors that can lead to trauma dumping behavior. Many individuals who engage in this practice often struggle with unprocessed trauma or lack appropriate, consistent outlets for emotional expression. The behavior might also serve as a coping mechanism, an attempt to create instant intimacy, or a cry for help. In some cases, childhood trauma can lead to boundary issues that manifest as inappropriate sharing in adulthood. Emotional dumping can also occur in individuals with autism spectrum disorder, social anxiety, or conditions impacting emotional self-regulation, where difficulties in or a lack of experience in interpersonal interactions can make it more difficult for the sharer to understand social cues from the listener, or in predicting the potential discomfort caused by sudden oversharing.

The internet is a common venue for trauma dumping, particularly through social media platforms. A related psychological phenomenon called "sadfishing" involves users sharing traumatic experiences to elicit sympathy and engagement. While these posts might temporarily alleviate feelings of isolation, psychological research indicates they can increase depression and anxiety among viewers, particularly adolescents. Unwarned posts about self-harm can become especially problematic, potentially triggering individuals with similar histories.

== Effects ==
Trauma dumping can significantly impact both the sharer and the receiver. Recipients often experience emotional drainage, frustration, or even secondary trauma from repeated exposure to disturbing content. For individuals with their own trauma history, such sharing can trigger re-traumatization. Meanwhile, those who "trauma dump" might find their relationships becoming strained or superficial, as others begin to withdraw from uncomfortable interactions.

=== Contrast with venting ===
Healthy venting creates a balanced exchange where both participants have opportunities to share their experiences while constructively working toward solutions. The person venting generally acknowledges their role in the social situation and demonstrates self-awareness towards how they are representing themselves and the emotional intensity of what they are discussing. Most importantly, such interactions intend to leave both parties feeling supported and understood, with the intent of fostering a stronger relationship.

Conversely, trauma dumping involves inappropriate timing and context for sharing traumatic experiences. The person sharing leaves minimal space for dialogue or reciprocal communication and often resists suggestions or solutions. These interactions become overwhelmingly focused on the trauma narrative, typically leaving listeners feeling emotionally depleted, powerless to help, and psychologically overwhelmed.

== Prevention ==
According to mental health practitioners, learning to manage emotional dumping as a victim of trauma involves developing greater self-awareness and understanding of appropriate contexts for sharing. Mental health professionals recommend considering several key questions before sharing traumatic experiences: the purpose of sharing, the relationship with the listener, the timing and setting, and the frequency of discussing the particular trauma.

For those who are the subject of emotional dumping, mental health practitioners generally state that establishing clear boundaries is necessary as a response. This might involve explicitly stating limits on certain topics or suggesting professional support when appropriate. Recipients should recognize that while supporting friends through difficult times is important, they are not obligated to serve as unofficial therapists.

=== Treatment approaches ===
Professional treatment for individuals who trauma dump typically involves comprehensive mental health care that addresses both the underlying trauma and the resulting behavioral patterns. Young adults, in particular, benefit from specialized approaches that combine evidence-based trauma therapy with support for co-occurring issues like substance abuse or disordered eating, involving not just processing past trauma but developing healthier ways of connecting with others and sharing experiences.

Clinical experts emphasize the importance of processing trauma in appropriate therapeutic settings rather than through casual disclosure. While venting emotions and sharing negative experiences can strengthen relationships when done in a controlled manner, trauma dumping often indicates a need for professional support. Mental health practitioners typically recommend trauma-informed therapy approaches, such as Eye movement desensitization and reprocessing (EMDR) or trauma-focused cognitive behavioral therapy, for addressing underlying trauma effectively.

Tech developers have also noted the potential for generative AI to aid those needing to frequently rant or discuss traumatic incidents by creating models meant to receive and give psychological advice, thus taking the emotional burden off of peers.

== See also ==
- Anxious-preoccupied attachment
- Dependent personality disorder
