= TAMAR Education Project =

Mental health intervention

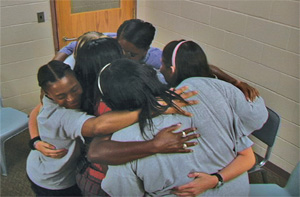
Group Hug in a Tamar's Children trauma healing group

The TAMAR Education Project is a manualized 10-week mental health intervention for justice-involved women and men with histories of psychological trauma which combines psycho-educational approaches and expressive therapies. It is designed for clients who have a recent treatment history for a mental health condition, a substance use disorder, and a history of physical and/or sexual abuse. TAMAR Groups have been implemented inside detention centers, state psychiatric hospitals, and in the community.

TAMAR is an acronym for Trauma, Addiction, Mental Health, and Recovery. but its meaning has also been connected to the Tamar described in the Hebrew Bible as well as a Middle-Eastern palm tree known for its flexibility and strength.

== History ==
Program development for the TAMAR Project began in October 1998 by the Sidran Institute of Towson, Maryland as one of nine sites funded through the first phase of the SAMHSA Women, Co-Occurring Disorders and Violence Study from 1998 to 2000. This pilot project was designed for "incarcerated women who have histories of abuse trauma." In July 2000, the program expanded to serve eight counties. The Maryland Department of Health and Mental Hygiene Administration continued to fund the project in 2001 after the SAMHSA pilot grant was no longer available. TAMAR was first adapted and implemented for men on July 1, 2001. In fiscal year 2002, the program served over 700 individuals. By September 2004, it was still implemented only in those eight counties and was serving approximately 350 individuals per year. However, since then it has been implemented throughout the state of Maryland, at Fulton State Hospital of Missouri, the Correctional Center of Northwest Ohio, and the Jail Diversion and Trauma Recovery–Priority to Veterans Program in Rhode Island.

== Content ==
The TAMAR Education Project is intended to provide clients with insight on trauma, its developmental effects on symptoms and current functioning, symptom appraisal and management, the impact of early chaotic relationships on healthcare needs, the development of coping skills, preventive education concerning pregnancy and sexually transmitted diseases, sexuality, and help in dealing with role loss and parenting issues. While this is an intervention in itself, it can also serve as preparation for more in-depth treatment. Participants are encouraged to share their stories with one another as well as engaging in expressive activities such as art therapy and journal writing.

The TAMAR Project requires collaboration, with education for not only the target population, but also trauma training for jail guards and probation officers. Training for correctional staff includes understanding trauma, vicarious traumatization, avoiding burnout, the prevalence of abuse among offenders, mental health issues, substance abuse issues, psychological crisis management. This training is also reciprocated, with correctional officers training involved social service agencies in the "language of corrections."

== Outcomes ==
Among pilot project participants, the recidivism rate was less than 3%. Anecdotal reports confirm this significant decline in recidivism for participants. No rigorous studies had been published on the effectiveness of TAMAR as of 2011.

== Adaptations ==
=== TAMAR's children ===
TAMAR's Children was developed in 2001 as a multi-agency collaboration to provide comprehensive inpatient and community-based supports for justice-involved pregnant and postpartum women who have co-occurring mental and substance use disorders with trauma histories. The program includes a psycho-educational/psycho-therapeutic process where women identify "their strengths and capabilities as mothers, allowing them to raise healthier, more resilient children, and to reintegrate their lives". Funding for TAMAR's children came from SAMHSA's Build Mentally Healthy Communities Grant, the HUD's Shelter Plus Care Grant, the Open Society Institute, the Abell Foundation, and DOJ Residential Substance Abuse Treatment funds.

=== Military ===
TAMAR has been adapted for men in the military. This program consists of 11 sessions on the following topics:

1. What is Trauma
2. PTSD and TBI
3. What is Battlemind
4. Adjusting to Cultural Change
5. Risky Behavior
6. Trauma and Addiction
7. Containment
8. Containment (continued)
9. Tolerating Stress
10. Self Soothing
11. Wrap Up and Graduation

== Funding ==
The majority of funding for TAMAR implementations has come from federal sources, including a Byrne Memorial Grant, a HUD Shelter Plus Care grant, PATH funds, a TAMAR Project grant, and money for participating in the SAMHSA (CSAT and CMHS) Jail Diversion Knowledge Development and Application Initiative. Additional funding has been provided by local sources including local governments, detention centers, and local social service agencies.

== See also ==
- Dual diagnosis
