= Auto-trolling =

Self-abuse on the Internet

How frequently did you cyberbully yourself?
1. 1-2x/yr (28.0%)
2. 1 ongoing episode (26.0%)
3. Once (23.0%)
4. 1x/month (23.0%)
Statistics from a report by the Massachusetts Aggression Reduction Center

Auto-trolling, self-cyberbullying, digital Munchausen or digital self-harm is a form of self-abuse on the Internet. It is usually done by teenagers posting fake insults on social media, attacking themselves to elicit attention and sympathy. A study in 2012 found that about 35 percent of those who did this felt better. Studies in 2016 and 2019 found an increase in prevalence in American adolescents rising from 6 to 9 per cent. In a 2011 study, boys were more likely than girls to admit to digital self-bullying. In a 2022 study published by researchers Justin Patchin, Sameer Hinduja, and Ryan Meldrum, US youth who engaged in digital self-harm were between five and seven times more likely to have considered suicide and between nine and fifteen times more likely to have attempted suicide.

Though digital self-harm can be done in various ways, it is usually done in a public or semi-public setting. Researchers Rinjani Soengkoeng and Ahmed Moustafa suggest that there are three types of digital self-harm. These are:

- social development (either determine if one's friends would defend them or prove one's resilience)
- personal gain (sympathy or entertainment)
- manifestation of negative emotions (which can derive from mental health issues, stressors, or social rejection).

These appear to be common reasons for digital self harm according to Sameer Hinduja and Justin W. Patchin's 2017 study of American middle and high school students.

== Contributing factors ==
Common correlations to digital self-harm include bullying, depression, negative emotionality, and sleep deprivation. There is also research that suggests digital self-harm and physical self-harm have similar causes and motivations. The two seem to be positively associated with physical self-harm and suicidal thoughts and behaviors.

== Prevention ==
Identifying and preventing digital self-harm is arguably more difficult than its offline counterpart. For one, it is hard for parents to monitor their child's online presence. Taking away internet access completely is usually impractical, as the internet is important for gaining important information from the outside world. There is a need to create strategies for digital self-harm prevention, as it is not the same as physical self harm or suicide. Due to anonymous apps such as Yik Yak, Whisper, and Secret, it is more difficult to track digital self-harm without possible invasion of privacy. Research by Dr. Sujita Kumar Kar suggests that "calling out" the behavior of digital-self harm may be counterproductive. Instead, encouragement to change online behavior may more beneficial in the long term.
