= Compassion fatigue in journalism =

Compassion fatigue (CF) is an evolving concept in the field of traumatology. The term has been used interchangeably with secondary traumatic stress (STS)s. Secondary traumatic stress is the term commonly employed in academic literature, although recent assessments have identified certain distinctions between compassion fatigue and secondary traumatic stress (STS).

Compassion fatigue is a form of traumatic stress resulting from repeated exposure to traumatized individuals or aversive details of traumatic events while working in a trauma-exposed profession. This indirect form of trauma exposure differs from experiencing trauma oneself.

The concept was originally observed and studied in healthcare providers and mental health providers. Recently the effects of compassion fatigue have been studied in numerous professional fields whose role involves witnessing human or animal suffering. These have included teachers, veterinarians, law enforcement officers, and journalists.

CF is considered to be the result of working directly with victims of disasters, trauma, or illness and can be applied to those working in journalism, photojournalism, film, media, and online content review.

Compassion fatigue has also been called secondary victimization, secondary traumatic stress, and vicarious traumatization.

== Symptoms ==
Professionals who experience compassion fatigue may exhibit a variety of symptoms including, but not limited to, lowered concentration, numbness or feelings of helplessness, irritability, lack of self-satisfaction, withdrawal, aches and pains, exhaustion, anger, or a reduced ability to feel empathy.

Those affected may experience an increase in negative coping behaviors such as alcohol and drug usage. Professionals who work in trauma-exposed roles may begin requesting more time off and consider leaving their profession.

Significant symptom overlap exists between compassion fatigue and other manifestations, such as posttraumatic stress disorder (PTSD). One distinguishing factor lies in the origin of these conditions, with PTSD stemming from primary or direct trauma, while compassion fatigue arises from secondary or indirect trauma.

== Prevention and mitigation ==
In an effort to reduce and minimize the impact of compassion fatigue, many organizations have begun implementing compassion fatigue and secondary traumatic stress prevention training which educate workers on the occupational risk in helping and protecting professions, raise awareness about symptoms, and teach skills such as coping tools to apply before and after stressful situations, working with integrity, and creating a support system that includes individuals and resources that can provide understanding and are sensitive to the risks of compassion fatigue. Workers also learn how to decompress and destress, utilizing self-care, and traumatic stress reduction tools.

Listed supports can include:

- Staff education and training
- Leadership and supervisory training
- Peer support training
- Peer support groups
- Workplace culture improvements
- Increased social supports
- Traditional therapeutic interventions
- Self-care tools
- Mindfulness

== Journalism ==
Journalists can suffer psychologically and emotionally from the stories that they cover. Journalists who encounter victims of trauma or traumatic situations on the job, are at risk of developing compassion fatigue, secondary traumatic stress, and experiencing symptoms similar to PTSD.

Predictive factors include, but are not limited to, the type of content they are reporting on, the conditions under which the content was acquired, the level of job commitment, perceived work pressure, and the amount of personal and professional social support.

== Photojournalism ==
Regarding the photographers side of Photojournalism, Sontag argues that photographing is essentially an act of non-intervention, therefore this inability to react in real life apparently touches photographer too.

Since the photographers cannot intervene in events, part of the horror of memorable coups of photojournalism, which includes images of death comes from the awareness of how plausible it has become, in situations where the photographer has the choice between a photograph and a life, to choose the photograph.

Even if the photographer creates sympathy, they also cut it off; they stir the senses but their 'realism crates a confession about the real', which, in the long term has the inevitable analgesic effect.

== Films and documentaries ==
Compassion, has grown in the joint between politics, humanitarian organizations, the media and the public. In the media there has been a growing focus on distant victims of civil wars, massacres and other violence against civil populations. The audience is left unmoved by the pictures of distant death and pain.

=== Nick Clooney ===
An example of compassion fatigue seen with documentaries is the case of Nick Clooney. After his visit to Darfur in 2006 where he documented the genocide. He wanted to tell people of the atrocities in Darfur, but wanted to encourage his audience to act on it. He chose the format of documentary because he felt it gave him more freedom to be “honest,” about what was happening in Darfur.

“ I went as a reporter, came back as an advocate."

In his book Human Rights Journalism, Seaga Shaw explains how there needs to be a bigger shift away from the familiar to the unfamiliar to provoke a reaction in audiences. Shaw advocates:

It will promote a better understanding of the undercurrents of the events and issues at stake, which will in turn provoke a more adequate response from the audience and live up to the expectations that journalism can influence the future direction of society.

—

== Content moderators ==
Though formal studies have not been conducted on this population of professionals, psychological distress in a social media content moderators has been recognized by courts in the 2020 ruling against Facebook which resulted in a $52 million USD settlement paid out to content moderators developing PTSD as a result of trauma exposure on the job.

== Social media ==
Social media and compassion fatigue are related by the bridge that media creates between its users and access to information. With all of the resources made available by the online world, most of its users tend to see tragic articles and stories on different social media on a daily basis. After a few hours, the overwhelming amount of information becomes emotionally draining for the human brain. The brain's natural response is to deny or suppress emotion, or in other words, to shut down compassion. Over time, the ongoing anguish is capable of creating a gap in the brain, and every emotion starts to become heavy and tiring. As a result of this fatigue from news information overload, news consumers become more selective about the news they consume via social media.

According to research made by Keith Payne and Dayrl Cameron, psychologists at UNC Chapel Hill, the more victims people see (getting hurt or killed) online, the more they shut their emotions, for fear of it becoming too much. Plus, choosing whether to experience or suppress an emotion might alter our empathetic feelings.

Overexposure to social media can also alter compassion in the way that people see reality. It blurs the line between what is acceptable, and take it to extremes. It can change how users see violence, creating a reality where violence is tolerable. It also open doors to racism, sexism, political rants, or any other form of discrimination against a social minority/group of people.

== See also ==
- Vicarious trauma after viewing media
