= Vandergriff =

Vandergriff is a surname. Notable people with the surname include:

- Donald Vandergriff, United States Army officer and writer
- Jerry Vandergriff (born c. 1942), American football player and coach
- Tom Vandergriff (1926–2010), American politician
