= Vicarious trauma after viewing media =

Secondary trauma influenced by mediated communication

Vicarious trauma after viewing media develops when an individual learns or hears about indirect experiences of a traumatic event through a source of media. The information they hear may have a negative psychological impact on the viewer, even though they did not directly experience the trauma themselves.

Over the last fifty years, there has been an increase in the different types of media that are accessible to the public, with most people using online search engines, social media, or other online news outlets to stay informed on global events. This increase can lead to users easily accessing negative images and stories about traumatic events that they would not have been exposed to otherwise. One thing to consider is how the dissemination of this information may be impacting the mental health of people who identify with the victims of the violence they hear and see through the media. The exposure to this traumatic content can lead to the vicarious traumatization of the viewers.

Research on vicarious trauma has focused on how mental health providers, medical workers, and first responders respond to the trauma they hear about in their everyday work experiences. While the worker does not directly experience the trauma, they develop symptoms similar to an individual diagnosed with post-traumatic stress disorder. Some of those symptoms include hypervigilance, difficulties sleeping, changes in how they view the world and themselves, and intrusive images of the trauma.

== Media ==
As research on vicarious trauma has expanded, researchers and journalists have begun to analyze how it might impact the general public. One of the ways information about traumatic events is dispersed is through the media, which includes news broadcasts and social media applications. The New York Times commented on how even though traumatic events have happened since the dawn of time, the news, and more recently, social media, is what allows people globally to stay informed about major events. The difference between major news organizations and social media is that most news organizations discuss how viewing traumatic or violent events impact their staff and consumers. Some media organizations flag content that could be considered disturbing to their viewers to decrease the amount of violent and traumatic content they release online. While major news outlets often regulate what they post, they still show the aftermath of traumatic events on their websites and in their newspapers. Examples include pictures of the twin towers after 9/11, the Boston bombing, and footage of the L.A. riots related to Rodney King.

=== Social media ===
While major media companies were the main source people received information about major events, people have also begun turning to social media to stay updated. Since the information is posted by private individuals, they are allowed to post unedited footage that may contain graphic and traumatic material to their social media platforms. There is also the risk of having distressing content appear on someone's page as an advertisement while they are browsing material that does not relate to the traumatic event, which can make the distressing content difficult to avoid since smartphones are constantly updating news around major events that happen in society.

== Outcomes ==
=== Impact on mood ===
Due to the increase of online social interactions, researchers have questioned the impact of indirect online contact on the emotions and thoughts of online users. While past studies have found that emotions can spread between people during direct social contact due to concepts like mimicry, researchers were unsure on if the same could happen through indirect contact made over social media. Coviello et al. (2014), found that people's posts on social media influenced the emotions and behaviors of other people who were their friends or who followed their online account. They also found that people tended to use language similar to the initial post they saw when responding or further commenting on their own posts to which causes them to further spread the same emotionally valent message to others. This research expanded on the knowledge that people's emotions were only influenced by nonverbal communication like the facial expressions and body language of the people around them to now also being influenced by text-only communication.

=== Influence on trauma reactions ===
As discussed in the section above, emotional contagion can happen through different forms of indirect contact with media. Over the last decade, researchers have found data to support the idea that some people are vicariously traumatized when viewing or reading media pertaining to a traumatic event. There has also appeared to be a correlation between the intensity of traumatization and amount exposed, those who reported viewing the traumatic events more often were most affected. Studies have questioned if media leads to a greater impact on the development of some symptoms of vicarious trauma and if a specific type of media had was greater impact than others. Holman et al. (2013) found that people who watched six or more hours of media coverage up to a week after the Boston bombings had higher stress levels than people who were directly exposed to the bombing. Goodwin et al. (2013) found that the participants in their study showed greater stress reactions when they took in information about the trauma from social media when compared to those who used more traditional forms of media.

Researchers have shown that social media is a major risk factor for a person to develop trauma symptoms, or even be diagnosed with post-traumatic stress disorder. The frequency of exposure to traumatic or disturbing information through media is related to the development of anxiety and PTSD-related symptoms. While the initial reaction to viewing media may cause acute stress symptoms, the severity will generally decrease over time. Repeated exposure to the distressing information or images may result in the development of longer-lasting symptoms.

== See also ==
- Psychological trauma
  - Vicarious traumatization
  - Compassion fatigue in journalism
