= Secondary trauma =

Psychological trauma from contact with traumatized people

Secondary trauma is psychological trauma which may be incurred by contact with people who have experienced traumatic events, exposure to disturbing descriptions of traumatic events by a survivor, or exposure to others inflicting cruelty on one another. Symptoms of secondary trauma are similar to those of PTSD (e.g. intrusive re-experiencing of the traumatic material, avoidance of trauma triggers/emotions, negative changes in thoughts and feelings, and hyperarousal). Secondary trauma has been researched in first responders, nurses and physicians, mental health care workers, and children of traumatized parents.

== Affected populations ==
=== Mental health care workers, social workers, and pink-collar workers ===
Secondary Traumatic Stress (STS) impacts many individuals in the mental health field; as of 2013, the prevalence rates for STS amongst different professions is as follows: 15.2% among social workers, 16.3% in oncology staff, 19% in substance abuse counselors, 32.8% in emergency nurses, 34% in child protective services workers, and 39% in juvenile justice education workers. There is a strong correlation between burnout and secondary traumatic stress among mental health care professionals who are indirectly exposed to trauma and there are a multitude of different risk factors that contribute to the likelihood of developing secondary traumatic stress amongst individuals who conduct therapy with trauma victims. Workers who have had a history of trauma are more likely to develop STS. Additionally, individuals who have less work support as well as less social support are at higher risk for developing STS. Lastly, as the number of patients seen by these workers increases, so do the chances of developing STS. Some of the protective factors for mental health care workers include years of experience in the profession, more time spent in self-care activities and high self-efficacy.

Another social work-related profession that is impacted by secondary trauma is librarianship. Public librarians work closely with vulnerable, at-risk populations, and often experience emotional and psychological strain while doing so.

=== First responders ===
Studies explain how secondary traumatic stress can negatively impact job performance in first responders which can lead to adverse outcomes not only for the first responders, but for the victims they seek to help. Job context is a greater risk factor for developing STS in first responders compared to the job content. This highlights the need for strategies targeted toward the organizational and systemic level in addition to the individual level. Organizational changes that can be addressed include work culture, workload, group support, supervision and education, and the modification of the work environment. Changes in these areas would foster resiliency for developing STS.

=== Nurses and physicians ===
Similarly, research highlights the importance of psychological services for nurses and medical professionals. Services similar to the ones listed above for the first responder population were valuable for reducing secondary traumatic stress symptoms amongst medical staff working with traumatic populations in hospital settings.

=== Children of traumatized parents ===
Van Ijzendoorn et al. (2003) conducted a meta-analysis of 32 studies with 4,418 participants in which they explored secondary trauma in children of Holocaust survivors. The authors found that in non-clinical studies no evidence of secondary traumatization, while clinical studies only showed evidence for secondary traumatization when additional stressors were also present. Intergenerational trauma or transgenerational trauma is also applied to describe the process by which parental traumatic experiences may lead to secondary trauma symptoms in their offspring, when additional stressors, such as war, famine, or displacement are present. Refugee children who are exposed to these additional stressors display heightened anxiety levels, and have an increased likelihood of experiencing traumatic life events, compared with non-refugee children in the United States.

== Measurements ==
The Secondary Trauma Self-Efficacy (STSE) Scale is a seven-item measure used to assess a person's beliefs about their ability to cope with barriers associated with secondary traumatic stress. The STSE measures one's "ability to cope with the challenging demands resulting from work with traumatized clients and perceived ability to deal with the secondary traumatic stress symptoms." In addition to the STSE, there is the STSS. The Secondary Trauma Stress Scale (STSS), is a 17-item questionnaire that measures the frequency of secondary traumatic stress symptoms over the past month. Questions on the STSS addresses issues with intrusion, avoidance and arousal symptoms similar to those found in PTSD.

== Interventions ==
Phipps and Byrne (2003) detail some potential treatments for STS based on the premise that STS and PTSD symptomology are similar in nature. Some brief interventions for STS include critical incident stress debriefing (CISD), critical incident stress management (CISM) and stress inoculation training (SIT). CISD is a one session exposure-based intervention aimed at reducing distress by having the client recall and explain the traumatic event to a group and a facilitator 48–72 hours after the traumatic incident. The facilitator then provides education on the reasons for the symptoms and processes of trauma in a safe environment. The seven-phase debriefing technique includes: 1. Introduction, 2. Expectations and facts, 3. Thoughts and impressions, 4. Emotional reactions, 5. Normalization, 6. Future planning/coping and 7. Disengagement. This has been shown by multiple studies to have damaging effects on the survivors and actually exacerbates the trauma symptoms present.

CISM is another one session exposure-based intervention aimed at reducing distress by having the client recall and explain the traumatic event but has a follow-up component. CISM consists of 3 phases: 1. Pre-trauma training, 2. Debriefing and 3. Individual follow-up. CISM differs from CISD in the sense that two components are added and believed to be the driving factors for symptom reduction in individuals with STS. Firstly, the pre-trauma training of Stress Inoculation training is implemented and secondly the follow-up assessments after one month.

SIT is a type of training that uses skills to lower autonomic arousal when exposed to the traumatic material. These techniques include muscle relaxation training, breathing retraining, covert self-dialogue and thought stopping. SIT provides skills to reduce trauma symptoms whereas CISD does not. These learned skills are imperative when faced with trauma symptoms and have been shown to be the most helpful type of intervention. It is recommended to implement both pre and post interventions in order to provide the best care.

Bercier and Maynard (2015) explain that, to date, there is no empirical evidence to support effectiveness of interventions for mental health care workers (psychologists, social workers, counselors and therapists) who experience symptoms of STS. Although there is no empirical support for the efficacy of these interventions, there still are some interventions that are recommended for reducing symptoms of STS. Accelerated Recovery Program (ARP) has been specifically designed to treat symptoms of STS. ARP is a five-session program aimed to reduce negative arousal states that result from STS. Primary focus of STS symptom reduction has been at the individual level, but some interventions to reduce STS symptoms have been proposed at the organizational level. These organizational interventions include the provision of supervision, workshops and supportive organizational culture.

== Similar concepts ==
Secondary trauma is often used interchangeably with several terms that have similar meanings including compassion fatigue, vicarious trauma, second victim syndrome, and job burnout. Although there is an overlap in terminology, there are nuanced differences.

=== Compassion fatigue ===
Compassion fatigue refers to a reduced capacity to help as a health care professional after being exposed to the suffering and distress of their patients. Secondary traumatic stress was later renamed compassion fatigue in 1995 by Charles Figley who described compassion fatigue as the natural emotions that arise as a result of learning about a significant others' experience with a traumatic event. Overall, compassion fatigue is often used interchangeably with secondary traumatic stress but the difference between the two is that STS is specific to individuals who treat traumatized populations whereas CF generalizes to individuals who treat an array of other populations.

=== Vicarious trauma ===
Vicarious traumatization (VT) is defined as a transformation of a helper's inner experience that is a result of empathic engagement with a client's traumatic experiences. This engagement with the client results in a shift in the cognitive schemas about oneself, the world, others. Vicarious trauma is similar to secondary traumatic stress, but individuals with VT display only one subtype characteristic of PTSD, negative changes in beliefs and feelings. VT fails to address other subtypes of PTSD symptoms (i.e. re-experiencing, avoidance, and hyperarousal).

=== Second Victim Syndrome (SVS) ===
Second Victim Syndrome (SVS) was defined originally by Albert Wu in 2000, describing the impact of medical error on Health Care Providers (HCPs), especially when there has been an error or the HCP feels responsibility for the outcome. "Although patients are the first and obvious victims of medical mistakes, doctors are wounded by the same errors: they are the second victims," wrote Wu in the BMJ. Susan D. Scott, PhD, RN, CPPS described a predictable phenomenological pattern that second victims experience after an adverse event: 1) chaos and accident response, (2) intrusive reflections, (3) restoring personal integrity, (4) enduring the inquisition, (5) obtaining emotional first aid and (6) moving on. SVS has been compared to PTSD affecting second victims and others further describe tertiary victims as hospital reputation and other patients due to subsequent medical errors.

=== Job burnout ===
Research describes job burnout as the burnout of an individual as a resultant of additive stress and lack of accomplishment in the workplace leading to poorer work performance. The concept of job burnout was originally developed to assess negative consequences of work-related exposure to a broad range of stressful situations experienced by human services employees. Job burnout is considered a symptom of STS, but STS is not a symptom of job burnout.
