= Donald Vandergriff =

American teacher and writer

Major Donald E. Vandergriff, United States Army (Ret.), is a teacher, writer and lecturer who specializes in military leadership education and training.

== Background ==
Vandergriff served with the United States Marine Corps and United States Army. He retired after 24 years of service. He holds a bachelor's degree in education from the University of Tennessee and a master's degree in military history from American Military University. He was the first major from the Army to lecture at the Naval War College.

== Influence ==
Lecturer, author and expert on military personnel issues, Dr. Jonathan Shay, refers to Vandergriff as “the most influential major in the U.S. Army”. Journalist James Fallows of The Atlantic Monthly has sought out Vandergriff for consultation of several of his articles, mentioning him in his piece “Will Iran be Next”, (December 2004).

== Bibliography ==
- Spirit, Blood and Treasure: The American Cost of Battle in the 21st Century. Presidio Press. 2001. p. 368. ISBN 978-0-89141-735-4. OCLC 477587644. – editor
- The Path to Victory: America's Army and the Revolution in Human Affairs. Presidio Press. 2002. pp. 288. ISBN 978-0-89141-766-8. OCLC 49327049.
- Raising the Bar: Creating and Nurturing Adaptability to Deal with the Changing Face of War. Center for Defense Information Press. 2006. p. 132. ISBN 978-1-932019-29-2. OCLC 84651549.
- Manning the Future Legions of the United States: Finding and Developing Tomorrow's Centurions. Praeger. 2008. p. 200. ISBN 978-0-313-34562-3. OCLC 778264910.
- Chapter: Robert L. Bateman III, ed. (2003). "The Culture Wars". Digital War: A View from the Front Lines. I Books. p. 320. ISBN 978-0-7434-7475-7. OCLC 41285094.
- The Revolution in Human Affairs
