= Gabriella Lettini =

Italian-American Waldensian pastor and academic

Gabriella Lettini (born in Turin on 25 February 1968) is an Italian-American Waldensian pastor and academic. Rev. Dr. Lettini is professor of theological ethics at the Graduate Theological Union and is Dean of the Starr King School for the Ministry in Berkeley, California. She is President of the American Waldensian Society and a member of the North Atlantic section of the European Society of Women in Theological Research.

== Academic career ==
Lettini graduated in 1995 from the Facoltà Valdese di Teologia (Waldensian Theological Seminary) in Turin with a thesis on the figure of Jesus in the cinema. She earned her PhD in Divinity from the Union Theological Seminary (New York City) with a dissertation titled The Allergy of the Other, which analyzes the theological conceptions of alterity (otherness) and the hegemonic schemes of the construction of identity.

In January 2011 Lettini organized in Rome an international interdisciplinary course on ecumenical theology. Bringing together all her institutional affiliations, she made the course a collaborative project of Waldensian Theological Seminary, Starr King School for the Ministry, Union Theological Seminary in New York, Union Presbyterian Seminary, and the American Waldensian Society. In a 2017 interview Lettini said she would like it if academic theology could develop more organically as community theology, with real dialogue between the believers and theologians; she thinks the current rapprochement between Protestants and Catholics is a good thing, but, pointing to the history of Christian complicity in the world's worst atrocities, she considers their differing theological tenets less important than "to offer a corrective to these aberrations of the Christian faith."

In 2017 she agreed to provide space at the Starr King School for the Ministry for the new women-led mosque Qalbu Maryam (the heart of Mary) upon request of mosque founder Rabiʻa Keeble, a 2012 alumna of that institution.

Lettini's recent research explores the different models of identity and their implications for theology and ethics; at the same time, she continues her research on movies as sources of theological reflection. In concert with Rita Nakashima Brock, Lettini has developed the practice of soul repair from "a wound of war called 'moral injury'," defined as "the violation of core moral beliefs."

== Publications ==
Lettini published her book Omosessualità (Homosexuality) in 1999, based on her experience in pastoral work. She has also published various contributions on syncretism, theology and culture, liberation theology, feminist theology, women and theology, cinema and religion, and religious tradition and "the Other" in articles and edited volumes.

=== Books ===
- Omosessualità (Turin: Claudiana Editrice, 1999).
- (with Rita Nakashima Brock) Soul Repair: Recovering from Moral Injury After War (Boston: Beacon Press, 2012).

=== Edited ===
- Dizionario di Teologia Femminista (Turin: Claudiana Editrice, 1999), the Italian translation and update of the Dictionary of Feminist Theologies, Letty M. Russell and J. Shannon Clarkson, eds. (Louisville, Kentucky: Westminster, John Knox Press, 1996).

=== Chapters ===
- "Martin Luther King e il dialogo intrareligioso" in Il sogno e la storia: L'attualità di Martin Luther King, Paolo Naso, ed. (Turin: Claudiana Editrice, 2008).
- "Coming Out as a Hybrid: Pain and Potentiality" in The End of Liberation? Liberation in the End! Feminist Theory, Feminist Theology and their Political Implications, Yearbook of the European Society of Women in Theological Research, vol. 10, edited by Charlotte Methuen and Angela Berlis (Leuven: Peeters, 2002), 192-196.
- "Hic Sunt Leones? Syncretism within the Ecumenical Movement" in Women, Ritual and Liturgy: Yearbook of the European Society of Women in Theological Research, vol. 9, edited by Susan Roll, Annette Esser, and Brigitte Enzner-Probst with Charlotte Methuen and Angela Berlis (Leuven: Peeters, 2001), 137-161.
- "Children's Rights Are Human Rights" in The Church Standing Up and Speaking Out on Human Values and Principles: Devotional Meditations on Social Justice, edited by Judy Brown (New York: Federation of Protestant Welfare Agencies, 1999), 54-55.
- "Praying with My Eyes Open: A Spiritual Journey" in Revisioning Our Sources: Women's Spirituality in European Perspectives, edited by Annette Esser, Anne Hunt Overzee, and Susan Roll (Kampen, the Netherlands: KOK Pharos, 1997), 150-169. Italian version: Gabriella Lettini and Piera Egidi, "Pregare ad occhi aperti" in Voci di Donne, edited by Piera Egidi (Turin: Claudiana, 1999), 59-62.

=== Journal articles ===
- "Embodying Radical Democracy" (co-written with Rosemary P. Carbine). Journal of Feminist Studies in Religion 25.1 (2009), 125-141.
- "Commitment to Otherness and Diversity." Union Seminary Quarterly Review, vol. 54 no. 3–4, (winter 2004), 191-194.
- "Review of Black Faith and Public Talk: Critical Essays on James Cone's Black Theology and Black Power," edited by Dwight N. Hopkins. Union Seminary Quarterly Review, vol. 54 no. 3–4, (winter (2000), 119-124.
- "La cura d'anime oggi." Protestantesimo vol. 44 no. 4 (1989), 275-279.
- "L'anno delle grandi pulizie: le elezioni amministrative statunitensi" Riforma, 12 November 2006, 1–2.
- "Una 'Passione' che divide: intervista a cura di Gian Mario Gillio" Confronti, vol. 31 no. 5 (May 2004), 19–22.
- "Mel Gibson: Una 'Passione' che oscura la resurrezione." Riforma, 23 April 2004, 9.
- "In Bush We Trust?" Voce Evangelica no. 7/8 (July/August 2003), 4-5.
- "L'America che ha detto no alla guerra." Confronti, vol. 30 no. 5 (May 2003), 20-21.
- "Echi di pace a New York: Le chiese sono uno dei luoghi di maggior fermento e riflessione sull'attuale conflitto." Riforma, 4 March 2003, 1-3.
- Le gang di New York: Religione e violenza nell'America di metà Ottocento nell'ultimo film di Scorsese." Riforma, 14 February 2003, 5.
- "Atonement and Victimization." Bulletin of the Colloquium on Violence and Religion, no. 19 (November 2000), 9-10.
- "Lontan dagli occhi, lontan dal cuore? Le chiese statunitensi dopo i bombardamenti NATO." Gioventù Evangelica, spring 2000, 5-7.
- "Tra aiuti umanitari e dissenso sommesso: le chiese americane e la crisi nei Balcani." Voce Evangelica, July 1999, 4-8.
- "Sul Kosovo: Dalla comunità dei neri americani un invito alla non violenza attiva e non selettiva: Intervista al teologo James H. Cone," in collaboration with Marinetta Cannito. Riforma, June 1999, 1-3.
- "Gesù sullo schermo." Voce Evangelica, November 1999, 8-13.
- "Sì al sincretismo se serve alla vita: Intervista a Chung Hyun Kyung." Confronti, vol. 35 no. 10 (October 1998), 23-24.
- "Teologia femminista: Dio, dov'eri mentre soffrivo?" Confronti, vol. 35 no. 10 (October 1998), 21-22.
- "Le spiritualità delle donne." Bollettino FDEI, winter 1997, 2-3.
- "Le nuove elezioni presidenziali e il dopo Monica." Riforma, November 1996, 1-2.
- "Clinton: grandi visioni, programmi modesti." Riforma, September 1996, 1-3.
- "A time to break down, and a time to build up: Voices from the Ecumenical Decade." Into the Light, spring 1996, 4–5.
- "Easter Movies in Critical Perspective." Episcopal New Yorker, vol. 161 no. 2 (April/May 1996), 1–5.

== See also ==
- Christianity and homosexuality
- Feminist theology
