= Gregory Nagy =

American classical scholar

- Nagy in 2025
- Born: Boszormenyi-Nagy Gergely; October 22, 1942 (age 83); Budapest, Hungary

Academic background
- Education: Indiana University (BA); Harvard University (PhD)

Academic work
- Discipline: Philology
- Sub-discipline: Ancient Greek literature
- Institutions: Harvard University
- Main interests: Homer

Gregory Nagy (Hungarian: Nagy Gergely, pronounced [ˈnɒɟ ˈgɛrgɛj]; born October 22, 1942) is an American classicist. He is a professor of classics at Harvard University, where he specializes in Homer and archaic Greek poetry. Nagy is known for extending Milman Parry and Albert Lord's theories about the oral composition-in-performance of the Iliad and Odyssey.

== Education and career ==
Nagy was born in Budapest on October 22, 1942. He was an infant when his family fled Budapest toward western Hungary and Austria to escape the advancing Soviet Red Army near the end of the Second World War. They made their way first to Canada and later to Indiana, where Nagy's father, Miklos Boszormenyi-Nagy, was invited to become a professor of classical piano at Indiana University.

Nagy received his B.A. from Indiana University in 1962 in classics and linguistics, and his Ph.D. from Harvard University in 1966 in classical philology, where Albert Lord was his mentor.

Since 1966, he has been a professor at Harvard University.

Since 2000, he has been the director of the Center for Hellenic Studies, a Harvard-affiliated research institution in Washington, D.C. In 2008, Nagy helped establish the Center for Hellenic Studies in Greece at Nafplio. He is the Francis Jones Professor of Classical Greek Literature and Professor of Comparative literature at Harvard, and continues to teach half-time at the Harvard campus in Cambridge, Massachusetts. From 1994 to 2000, he served as Chair of the Classics Department at Harvard University. He was Chair of Harvard's undergraduate Literature Concentration from 1989 to 1994. He served as the president of the American Philological Association in the academic year 1990-1991.

From 2015 to 2021, he posted about his work on a frequent basis at his research blog, Classical Inquiries.

Since 2008, Nagy has been leading a spring break tour for Harvard students and alumni to Nafplio, Mycenae, Olympia, Delphi and Athens, among other places.

== Massive open online course ==
In 2013 Harvard offered his popular class, The Ancient Greek Hero, which thousands of Harvard students, including Caroline Kennedy, Fernando Gonzalez Sfeir, Kyriakos Mitsotakis, and Matt Damon, among others, had taken over the last few decades, through edX as a massive open online course. To assist Professor Nagy, Harvard appealed to alumni to volunteer as online mentors and discussion group managers. About 10 former teaching fellows have also volunteered. The task of the volunteers is to focus online class discussion on the course material. The course had 27,000 students registered.

== Honors, awards and recognitions ==
- Andrew Carnegie Foundation Great Immigrant, 2026
- Commander of the Order of Honor (bestowed by the president of Greece), 2019
- Onassis International Prize for the promotion of Hellenic Studies, 2006
- American Academy of Arts and Sciences, elected 1987
- American Philological Assocation's Award of Merit "The Best of the Achaeans," 1982

== Honorary doctorates; Doctor honoris causa ==
- 2021 University of Crete, Rethymnon
- 2009 Aristotelian University of Thessaloniki
- 2009 University of Patras
- 2003 Universite Charles-de-Gaulle-Lille III

== Public intellectual ==
Nagy was a literary consultant and expert on the Greek text for clinical psychiatrist Dr. Jonathan Shay's PTSD study "Achilles in Vietnam: Combat Trauma and the Undoing of Character." Shay had written a journal article about combat stress as described in Homer's Iliad in 1991. Nagy encouraged Shay to expand the topic into a full-length book on the nature and treatment of PTSD.

With respect to the 2004 film Troy, Nagy commented that the film alters the core dynamics of Homer's Iliad. The motion picture removes all divine intervention, alters the relationship between Achilles and Patroclus, and condenses the ten-year siege into a matter of weeks. At the same time, Nagy's explanation of the "kleos aphthiton" (eternal glory) sought by Achilles in fighting heroically to his death is reflected in the film.

In connection with the wide-spread publicity about the filming of a motion picture directed by Christopher Nolan and starring Matt Damon titled The Odyssey, Nagy has been asked to comment publicly about various translations of Homer's Odyssey, the ancient Greek conception of a hero, the themes and meaning of the story, and why it continues to captivate the modern imagination.

== Personal life ==
Nagy and his wife, Olga Davidson, Research Fellow, Institute for the Study of Muslim Societies and Civilizations, Boston University and chair of the Ilex Foundation, served as Faculty Deans (previously called co-masters) of Currier House at Harvard from 1986 to 1990. During Nagy's tenure as Faculty Dean, one of the students in residence was Kyriakos Mitsotakis, a future prime minister of Greece. Nagy and his wife have one son, Lazlo, and one daughter, Antonia. She is a photographer, film maker and comedian and is known professionally as "Toni" Nagy.

Nagy has two brothers in allied fields: Blaise Nagy is a professor emeritus of Classics at the College of the Holy Cross in Worcester, Massachusetts, while Joseph F. Nagy is the Henry L. Shattuck Professor of Irish Studies in the Department of Celtic Languages and Literatures at Harvard University.

== Works ==
=== Books ===
==== As sole author ====
- Nagy, Gregory, Greek Dialects and the Transformation of an Indo-European Process (Harvard University Press, 1970)
- Nagy, Gregory, Comparative Studies in Greek and Indic Meter (Harvard University Press, 1974)
- Nagy, Gregory, The Best of the Achaeans: Concepts of the Hero in Archaic Greek Poetry, Revised Edition (Johns Hopkins University Press, 1998; original publication, 1979)
- Nagy, Gregory, Greek Mythology and Poetics (Cornell University Press, 1990)
- Nagy, Gregory, Pindar's Homer: The Lyric Possession of an Epic Past (Johns Hopkins University Press, 1990)
- Nagy, Gregory, Poetry as performance. Homer and beyond. (Cambridge University Press, 1996)
- Nagy, Gregory, Homeric Questions (University of Texas Press, 1996)
- Nagy, Gregory, Plato's Rhapsody and Homer's Music : The Poetics of the Panathenaic Festival in Classical Athens (Harvard University Press, 2002)
- Nagy, Gregory, Homeric Responses (University of Texas Press, 2003)
- Nagy, Gregory, Homer's Text And Language (University of Illinois Press, 2004)
- Nagy, Gregory, Homer the Classic (Harvard University Press, 2009)
- Nagy, Gregory, Homer: The Preclassic (University of California Press, 2010)
- Nagy, Gregory, The Ancient Greek Hero in 24 Hours (Harvard University Press, 2013)
- Nagy, Gregory, The Homeric Hymn to Aphrodite (Lulu Press, 2014) – Illustrations by Glynnis Fawkes.
- Nagy, Gregory, The Homeric Hymn to Dionysos (Lulu Press, 2015) – Illustrations by Glynnis Fawkes.

==== As editor or co-editor ====
- Victor Bers and Nagy, G. eds., The Classics In East Europe: From the End of World War II to the Present (American Philological Association Pamphlet Series, 1996)
- Nicole Loraux, Nagy, G., and Slatkin, L., eds., Postwar French Thought vol. 3, Antiquities (New Press, 2001)
- Nagy, Gregory ed. with very brief introductions to collections of reprinted articles, Greek Literature (Taylor and Francis, London, 2001; Routledge, 2002), 9 vols.

=== Articles ===
- Nagy, Gregory, "The Professional Muse and Models of Prestige in Ancient Greece", Cultural Critique 12 (1989) 133–143
- Nagy, Gregory, "Early Greek Views of Poets and Poetry", in: The Cambridge History of Literary Criticism, vol. 1 (ed. G. Kennedy; Cambridge 1989; paperback 1993) 1–77
- Nagy, Gregory, "The Crisis of Performance", in: The Ends of Rhetoric: History, Theory, Practice (ed. J. Bender and D.E. Wellbery; Stanford 1990) 43–59
- Nagy, Gregory, "Distortion diachronique dans l'art homérique: quelques précisions", in: Constructions du temps dans le monde ancien (ed. C. Darbo-Peschanski; Paris 2000) 417–426.
- Nagy, Gregory, "The Name of Achilles: Questions of Etymology and 'Folk-Etymology.'" Illinois Classical Studies 19 (1994): 3–9. http://www.jstor.org/stable/23065415.

== See also ==
- Albert Lord
- Oral theory in Homeric scholarship
- Oral-formulaic composition
