= Attention seeking =

To act in a way that is likely to elicit attention

Attention seeking behavior is to act in a way that is likely to elicit attention. Attention seeking behavior as a pathological personality trait is defined in the DSM-5 as "engaging in behavior designed to attract notice and to make oneself the focus of others' attention and admiration". This definition does not ascribe a motivation to the behavior and assumes a human actor, although the term "attention seeking" sometimes also assumes a motive of seeking validation. People are thought to engage in both positive and negative attention seeking behavior independent of the actual benefit or harm to health. In line with much research and a dynamic self-regulatory processing model of narcissism, motivations for attention seeking are considered to be driven by self-consciousness and thus an externalization of personality rather than internal and self-motivated behavior. Attention seeking is often caused by threats to one's self-concept and the need for social acceptance. This type of influence on behavior can result in a potential loss of a person's sense of agency, personality disorder and the behavior associated with these conditions.

Enjoying the attention of others is socially acceptable in some situations, and attention-seeking may be adaptive in some contexts like acting (upstaging) or marketing. However, an excessive need for attention is often a symptom of an underlying personality disorder and can lead to difficulties in interpersonal relationships. One strategy often used by teachers and behavior analysts to counter attention-seeking behavior is planned or tactical ignoring.

== Causes ==
The causes of attention seeking behavior are varied. Risk factors leading to attention seeking behavior include loneliness, jealousy, low self-esteem, narcissism, rejection, and self-pity. A desire for validation is theorised as a motivation for attention seeking behavior. As of 2022, no studies have evaluated the prevalence of attention seeking behavior in the general population.

One area of concern with attention seeking is misbehavior in classroom settings. Research has shown that parental rejection leads young students to adopt a diminished sense of self consequently resulting in the child feeling insecure, undervalued, and powerless. Experiencing rejection pushes the child to strive for acceptance through attention seeking behaviors. These children may grow in assertiveness as a means of being heard and seen. Thus, rejected children embrace attention seeking behaviors to feel some sense of security and acceptance.

Repeated attention seeking behavior is a symptom of several personality disorders, including narcissistic personality disorder (NPD), histrionic personality disorder, borderline personality disorder, and sometimes (though more rarely) in antisocial personality disorder. The Alternative DSM-5 Model for Personality Disorders (AMPD) conceptualizes personality disorders as consisting of impairment in level of personality functioning and presence of pathological personality traits. One such trait is attention seeking, part of the trait domain Antagonism. Along with grandiosity, this is one of two traits required for the AMPD diagnosis of NPD. Traits can also be included in diagnosis of other AMPD PDs as specifiers, elaborating on the clinical picture.

Attention-seeking behavior should be distinguished from impulsive or disruptive behaviors associated with ADHD; while ADHD can sometimes make it difficult to suppress normal attention-seeking impulses, most ADHD-related misbehavior is not motivated by attention-seeking.

A 2019 study on adolescents with narcissistic tendencies and the use of social media explores this relation between narcissism and attention seeking behavior. In the study it was found that adolescents' social media behavior was used as a means of gaining acceptance, validation, and attention. The research suggests that the need of motives behind social acceptance mediated the link between social media use and narcissism. The research also found that attention seeking behavior increases when these adolescents experience social rejection or threats to their ego/self-image.

== Stigma and criticism ==
The term "attention seeking" has been the subject of criticism for its usage as a pejorative term as a kind of victim blaming, especially when it is used in a non-clinical and non-academic context. Student exposure to psychiatric environments has shown evidence to reduce bias and stigma towards individuals with mental disorders or attention-seeking behavior.

According to a 2005 survey of 133 books containing the term, the term is often used with either no definition or a poor definition, no empirical studies specifically about attention seeking behavior were found, and there existed widespread academic disagreement on the causes and implications of attention seeking.

Self-harm is sometimes viewed as an attention-seeking behaviour. However, young people who self-harm rarely disclose it to friends or family, and they seldom seek medical attention or other support. Therefore, the idea that self-harm is primarily attention-seeking is a myth.

== In social media and technology ==
There exists research on the relationship between social media usage and attention seeking behavior.

A 2013 study of Facebook users found that agreeableness and conscientiousness are negatively correlated with attention seeking tendencies. Internet trolls in social media also tend to exhibit attention seeking behavior. A 2016 study found evidence that social media can benefit some users by compensating for a lack of attention in other domains, although this has been disputed.

A 2019 study found evidence correlating narcissism with attention seeking behavior on Facebook.

A 2021 study found that experiencing phubbing (being ignored in favor of focusing on a phone) was positively correlated with attention seeking behavior, and the effect was larger in men.

== Tactical ignoring ==
Tactical ignoring is a behavioral management strategy, used to combat attention seeking behaviors, where a person gives no outward sign of recognizing a behavior, such as no eye contact, no verbal response and no physical response to the person seeking attention. However, they are very aware of the behavior and monitor the individual to ensure their safety and the safety of others that are potentially involved. The desired consequence of attention-seeking behavior is receiving attention in some form (positive or negative) from another person. Tactical ignoring is often used in the hopes that when an attention-seeking behavior no longer attracts attention, it will eventually cease. It is most frequently used in the behavioral training of children, but is suitable for changing or shunning adult behavior as well.

== See also ==
- Münchausen syndrome
- Personality disorders – A sustained pattern of attention seeking in adults is associated with histrionic personality disorder, borderline personality disorder and narcissistic personality disorder.
- Self-destructive behavior – It is a common misconception that self-destructive behavior is inherently attention seeking, or at least that attention is a primary motive.
- Coping (psychology)
- Sadfishing
- Sensation seeking
