= Sadfishing =

Seeking sympathy by exaggerating emotional problems

Sadfishing is a term used to describe a behavioural trend where people make exaggerated claims about their emotional problems to generate sympathy. The name is a play on "catfishing." Sadfishing is a common reaction for someone going through a hard time, or pretending to be going through a hard time. Sadfishing is said to hurt younger people, exposing them to bullying and child grooming. This is due to people sharing their personal and emotional stories online, a practice which sometimes result in the individual sharing the story being targeted by online abusers. Another consequence of this behaviour is that people with "real problems" end up being overlooked or even accused of sadfishing themselves and being bullied for it.

Young people who seek support online have started being accused of sadfishing, a report has said. The report says that the accusations of sadfishing could further harm young people with mental health problems. Sadfishing is related to cyberbullying, and is often looked upon as a method of attention seeking. Sadfishing has been said to attract bullies and paedophiles.

== Background ==
The first known usage of the word sadfishing was in January 2019, in an article for the Metro, written by Rebecca Reid in reference to Kendall Jenner's Instagram posts about her acne problems, posting pictures of herself while talking about it. The term was later picked up by Good Morning Britain, where they did an interview and talked about it. It started trending on social media at the start of October 2019, with several news channels and newspapers picking it up.

== Potential causes ==
Sadfishing can be caused by many things, the main reason being that someone doesn't get enough attention, and/or has low self-respect. This is proven by the fact that people sadfishing are looking for compliments: very close to narcissistic behaviour, but with desire for compliments from other people for self-satisfaction. Research has found that individuals engaging in sad-fishing tend to have an anxious attachment style. Sometimes adults partake in sadfishing because of jealousy. When someone finds themselves threatened by another person who takes all the attention, they may respond with sadfishing behaviour. Loneliness can result in sadfishing as well; by posting about their emotional problems, people tend to crave attention. Posts about anxiety and depression are really common while sadfishing, as people tend to show care and give attention to the one sadfishing. Another reason for sadfishing can be that someone feels uncomfortable sharing feelings with their close friends or family, and as a result they turn to social media to share feelings for sympathy and attention. Anti-social behaviour can lead to sadfishing as well: if someone has no friends and no one to talk to, they often end up sharing it online. Another reason for sadfishing can be trolling; people will troll and see if they can hook an audience onto themselves. Sadfishing can also be because of actually wanting help; people tend to sadfish in order to feel better, after letting people know that they need help.

== Separating sadfishing from crisis ==
It can be difficult to tell if a person is looking for support, sympathy, or if the person is at risk for harming themselves. This is due to the fact that social media often lacks context and the ability to read nonverbal cues, says Dr. Lindsey Giller, a clinical psychologist in New York. People at risk for suicide will show other signs in addition to talking about suicide; such as a deepening depression, expression of feeling trapped, feelings of worthlessness, or a preoccupation with death. They may even post online if they are considering suicide or self-harm; this can help stop suicide or self-harm if taken seriously. Taking people seriously is a must, as talking about suicide can be a plea for help, and can also be a late sign in the progression towards a suicide attempt. There is no way to know if a friend is suffering or in crisis, or is only seeking attention, especially if you're not a mental health professional. As such, each alarming post should be taken seriously, notes Dr. Jelena Kecmanovic, a clinical psychologist in Arlington, Virginia.

== See also ==
- Attention seeking
- Cyberbullying
- Emotional dumping
