= Journal of School Violence =

- Subject: School violence
- Language: English
- Edited by: Ryan W. Randa, Brad W. Reyns

Publication details
- History: 2002–present
- Publisher: Routledge
- Frequency: Quarterly
- Impact factor: 2.421 (2016)

Standard abbreviations
- ISO 4: J. Sch. Violence

Indexing
- ISSN: 1538-8220 (print); 1538-8239 (web)
- LCCN: 2002213467
- OCLC no.: 819293864

Links
- Journal homepage; Online access; Online archive

The Journal of School Violence is a quarterly peer-reviewed scientific journal covering the study of school violence. It was established in 2002 and was originally published by Haworth Press, but is now published by Taylor & Francis' subsidiary Routledge. The editors-in-chief are Ryan W. Randa (Sam Houston State University) and Brad W. Reyns (Weber State University). According to the Journal Citation Reports, the journal has a 2016 impact factor of 2.421.
