= Journal of Early Adolescence =

- Discipline: Psychology
- Language: English
- Edited by: Alexander T Vazsonyi

Publication details
- History: 1981–present
- Publisher: SAGE Publications
- Frequency: 9/year
- Impact factor: 1.828 (2017)

Standard abbreviations
- ISO 4: J. Early Adolesc.

Indexing
- ISSN: 0272-4316 (print); 1552-5449 (web)
- LCCN: 82644019
- OCLC no.: 6842183

Links
- Journal homepage; Online access; Online archive

The Journal of Early Adolescence is a peer-reviewed academic journal that publishes papers in the field of Psychology. The journal's editor is Alexander T Vazsonyi (University of Kentucky). It has been in publication since 1981 and is currently published by SAGE Publications.

== Abstracting and indexing ==
The Journal of Early Adolescence is abstracted and indexed in, among other databases: SCOPUS, and the Social Sciences Citation Index. According to the Journal Citation Reports, its 2017 impact factor is 1.828, ranking it 39 out of 73 journals in the category 'Psychology, Developmental'. and 19 out of 46 journals in the category 'Family Studies'.
