= Compassion fatigue =

Condition characterized by emotional and physical exhaustion

Compassion fatigue is an evolving concept in the field of traumatology. The term has been used interchangeably with secondary traumatic stress (STS), which is sometimes simply described as the negative cost of caring. Secondary traumatic stress is the term commonly employed in academic literature, although recent assessments have identified certain distinctions between compassion fatigue and secondary traumatic stress (STS).

Compassion fatigue is a form of traumatic stress resulting from repeated exposure to traumatized individuals or aversive details of traumatic events while working in a helping or protecting profession. This indirect form of trauma exposure differs from experiencing trauma oneself.

Compassion fatigue is considered to be the result of working directly with victims of disasters, trauma, or illness, especially in the health care industry. Individuals working in other helping professions are also at risk for experiencing compassion fatigue. These include doctors, caregivers, child protection workers, veterinarians, clergy, teachers, social workers, palliative care workers, journalists, police officers, firefighters, paramedics, animal welfare workers, health unit coordinators, and student affairs professionals. Non-professionals, such as family members and other informal caregivers of people who have a chronic illness, may also experience compassion fatigue. The term was coined in 1992 by Carla Joinson to describe the negative impact hospital nurses were experiencing as a result of their repeated, daily exposure to patient emergencies.

== Symptoms ==
People who experience compassion fatigue may exhibit a variety of symptoms including, but not limited to, lowered concentration, numbness or feelings of helplessness, irritability, lack of self-satisfaction, withdrawal, aches and pains, exhaustion, anger, or a reduced ability to feel empathy. Those affected may experience an increase in negative coping behaviors such as alcohol and drug usage. Professionals who work in trauma-exposed roles may begin requesting more time off and consider leaving their profession.

Significant symptom overlap exists between compassion fatigue and other manifestations, such as posttraumatic stress disorder (PTSD). One distinguishing factor lies in the origin of these conditions, with PTSD stemming from primary or direct trauma, while compassion fatigue arises from secondary or indirect trauma.

== History ==
Compassion fatigue has been studied by the field of traumatology, with Charles Figley playing a pivotal role by characterizing it as the "cost of caring" experienced by individuals in helping professions. The term was introduced to the literature in 1992 by Carla Joinson to describe the negative impact hospital nurses were experiencing as a result of their repeated, daily exposure to patient emergencies. However, the phrase had been in use as early as 1961, and was popularized in 1985 when Bob Geldof cited it as his reasoning for ending his charity work after Live Aid.

To a certain extent, the term "compassion fatigue" is considered somewhat euphemistic and is used as a substitute for its academic counterpart, secondary traumatic stress.

Compassion fatigue has also been called secondary victimization, secondary traumatic stress, vicarious traumatization, and secondary survivor. Other related conditions are rape-related family crisis and "proximity" effects on female partners of war veterans.

== Measuring and assessments ==
Some of the earliest and most commonly used assessment are Compassion Fatigue Self Test (CFST), Compassion Satisfaction and Fatigue Test (CSFT) and Compassion Fatigue Scale—Revised.

The self-assessment ProQOL (or Professional Quality of Life Scale) contains three sub-scales: compassion satisfaction, burnout, compassion fatigue / secondary traumatic stress.

The Secondary Traumatic Stress Scale (STSS) assess the frequency of intrusion, avoidance, and arousal symptoms associated with indirect exposure to traumatic events through clinical work with traumatized populations.

== Risk factors ==
Many organizational attributes in the fields where STS is most common contribute to compassion fatigue among the workers, such as in healthcare where a "culture of silence" is normalized by not discussing stressful events, such as deaths in an intensive-care unit, after the event increase rates of CF. Additional contributing organizational factors can result from conditions such as long work hours, short-staffing, workplace incivility, and feelings of dismissal or invalidation by their managers.

Lack of awareness of symptoms and poor training in the risks associated with their trauma-exposed profession results in higher rates of STS.

Traumatization symptom levels usually depend on three criteria: proximity, intensity, and duration. Proximity refers to how close the provider is to the traumatic event, intensity is defined by how extensive and extreme the traumatic event is, and duration refers to how long the provider is involved with the traumatic event.

Compassion fatigue increases in intensity with increased interactions among the needy. Because of this, people living in urban cities are more likely to experience compassion fatigue. People in large cities interact with more people in general, and because of this, they become desensitized towards people's problems. Homeless people often make their way to larger cities. Ordinary people often become indifferent to homelessness when they see it regularly.

Pathological altruism can contribute to depression.

== Family ==
Recent studies reveal that the "overall compassion fatigue and compassion satisfaction levels were moderate, thus highlighting the potential risk of compassion fatigue for family caregivers", indicating that primary family caregivers of patients could also experience compassion fatigue or STS.

== In healthcare professionals ==
Between 16% and 85% of health care workers in various fields develop compassion fatigue. In one study, 86% of emergency room nurses met the criteria for compassion fatigue. In another study, more than 25% of ambulance paramedics were identified as having severe ranges of post-traumatic symptoms. In addition, 34% of hospice nurses in another study met the criteria for secondary traumatic stress/compassion fatigue.

There is a strong relationship between work-related stress and compassion fatigue which include factors such as: attitude to life, work-related stress, how one works, amount of time working at a single occupation, type of work, and gender all play a role. Research done among nursing during the COVID-19 pandemic found that active coping strategies, such as seeking support socially and problem- solving, were associated with higher compassion satisfaction and lower levels of burnout, while avoidance-based coping was associated with higher emotional distress. Coping strategies were found to predict approximately 25.4% of the variance in compassion fatigue outcomes in this population.

Compassion fatigue is the emotional and physical distress caused by treating and helping patients that are deeply in need. This can desensitize healthcare professionals to others' needs, causing them to develop a lack of empathy for future patients. There are three important components of Compassion Fatigue: Compassion satisfaction, secondary stress, and burnout. Burnout is not the same as compassion fatigue; burnout is the stress and mental exhaustion caused by the inability to cope with the environment and continuous physical and mental demands.

Healthcare professionals experiencing compassion fatigue may find it difficult to continue doing their jobs. While many believe that these diagnoses affect workers who have been practicing in the field the longest, the opposite proves true. Young physicians and nurses are at an increased risk for both burnout and compassion fatigue. A study published in the Western Journal of Emergency Medicine revealed that medical residents who work overnight shifts or work more than eighty hours a week are at higher risk of developing Compassion Fatigue. Burnout was another major contributor to these professionals who had a higher risk of suffering from Compassion Fatigue. Burnout is a prevalent and critical contemporary problem that can be categorized as suffering from emotional exhaustion, de-personalization, and a low sense of personal accomplishment. They can be exposed to trauma while trying to deal with compassion fatigue, potentially pushing them out of their career field. If they decide to stay, it can negatively affect the therapeutic relationship they have with patients because it depends on forming an empathetic, trusting relationship that could be difficult to make amid compassion fatigue. Because of this, healthcare institutions are placing increased importance on supporting their employee's emotional needs so they can better care for patients.

Studies compiled in 2018 by Zang et al. indicate that the level of education one obtains in the field of healthcare has an effect on levels of burnout, compassion satisfaction, and compassion fatigue. Studies show, it is indicated that those with higher levels of education in their respective field will experience lower rates of burnout and compassion fatigue, while also having increased levels of compassion satisfaction.

Another name and concept directly tied to compassion fatigue is moral injury. Moral injury in the context of healthcare was directly named in the Stat News article by Drs. Wendy Dean and Simon Talbot, entitled "Physicians aren't 'burning out.' They're suffering from moral injury." The article and concept go on to explain that physicians (in the United States) are caught in double and triple and quadruple binds between their obligations of electronic health records, their student loans, the requirements for patient load through the hospital, and procedures performed – all while working towards the goal of trying to provide the best care and healing to patients possible. However, the systemic issues facing physicians often cause deep distress because the patients are suffering despite the physician's best efforts. This concept of moral injury in healthcare is the expansion of the discussion around compassion fatigue and burnout. Cross-cultural research has found variation in how compassion is expressed, with differences shown across different populations between the U.S., Latin America, and Turkey in measures of empathy and helping behavior.

=== C.N.A.s/caregivers ===
Caregivers for dependent people can also experience compassion fatigue, which can become a cause of abusive behavior in caring professions. It results from the taxing nature of showing compassion for someone whose suffering is continuous and unresolvable. One may still care for the person as required by policy, however, the natural human desire to help them is significantly diminished, causing desensitization and lack of enthusiasm for patient care. This phenomenon also occurs among professionals involved in long-term health care, and for those who have institutionalized family members. These people may develop symptoms of depression, stress, and trauma. Those who are primary care providers for patients with terminal illnesses are at a higher risk of developing these symptoms. In the medical profession, this is often described as "burnout": the more specific terms secondary traumatic stress and vicarious trauma are also used.

=== Mental health professionals ===
Many that work in fields that require great amounts of empathy and compassion are exposed to these stressful experiences in their day-today work activities. These fields mentioned include: social workers, psychologists, oncologists, pediatrics, HIV/AIDs workers, EMS, law enforcement, and general healthcare workers like nurses, etc. Social workers are one group that can experience compassion fatigue or STS from experiencing a singular trauma or it can be from traumatic experiences building up over the years. This can also occur because of a connection with a client and a shared similar traumatic experience. Overall, healthcare professionals in general are finding that they are burnt out with the price of empathy and compassion, otherwise known as, Compassion Fatigue. Most often describe feelings of "running on empty". The importance of the contribution of education and recognition cannot be negated in its import of counter of compassion fatigue. Other evidences support theories that meditation and reflection techniques such as Mindful-Based Stress Reduction Training and Compassion Cultivation Training, along with the support of administrators helps to fight and reduce STS.

=== Critical care personnel ===
Critical care personnel have the highest reported rates of burnout, a syndrome associated with progression to compassion fatigue. These providers witness high rates of patient disease and death, leaving them to question whether their work is truly meaningful. Additionally, top-tier providers are expected to know an increasing amount of medical information along with experienced high ethical dilemmas/medical demands. This has created a workload-reward imbalance—or decreased compassion satisfaction. Compassion satisfaction relates to the "positive payment" that comes from caring. With little compassion satisfaction, both critical care physicians and nurses have reported the above examples as leading factors for developing burnout and compassion fatigue. Those caring for people who have experienced trauma can experience a change in how they view the world; they see it more negatively. It can negatively affect the worker's sense of self, safety, and control. In ICU personnel, burnout and compassion fatigue has been associated with decreased quality of care and patient satisfaction, as well as increased medical errors, infection rates, and death rates, making this issue one of concern not only for providers but patients. These outcomes also impact organization finances. According to the Institute of Medicine, preventable adverse drug events or harmful medication errors (associated with compassion fatigue/burnout) occur in 1% to 10% of hospital admissions and account for a $3.5 billion cost.

There are a total of four factors that are used to describe the underlying reasons for burnout, STS, and compassion fatigue: depressive mood, primary traumatic stress symptoms, responses to their patients' trauma, and sleep disturbances.

Those with a better ability to empathize and be compassionate are at a higher risk of developing compassion fatigue. Because of that, healthcare professionals—especially those who work in critical care—who are regularly exposed to death, trauma, high stress environments, long work days, difficult patients, pressure from a patient's family, and conflicts with other staff members- are at higher risk. These exposures increase the risk for developing compassion fatigue and burnout, which often makes it hard for professionals to stay in the healthcare career field. Those who stay in the healthcare field after developing compassion fatigue or burnout are likely to experience a lack of energy, difficulty concentrating, unwanted images or thoughts, insomnia, stress, desensitization and irritability. As a result, these healthcare professionals may later develop substance abuse, depression, or commit suicide. A 2018 study that examined differences in compassion fatigue in nurses based on their substance use found significant increases for those who used cigarettes, sleeping pills, energy drinks, antidepressants, and anti-anxiety drugs. Unfortunately, despite recent, targeted efforts being made to reduce burnout, it appears that the problem is increasing. In 2011, a study conducted by the Department of Medicine Program on Physician Well-Being at Mayo Clinic reported that 45% of physicians in the United States had one or more symptoms of burnout. In 2014, that number had increased to 54%.

== In student affairs professionals ==
In response to the changing landscape of post-secondary institutions, sometimes as a result of having a more diverse and marginalized student population, both campus services and the roles of student affairs professionals have evolved. These changes are efforts to manage the increases in traumatic events and crises.

Due to the exposure to student crises and traumatic events, student affairs professionals, as front line workers, are at risk for developing compassion fatigue. Such crises may include sexual violence, suicidal ideation, severe mental health episodes, and hate crimes/discrimination.

Some research shows that almost half of all university staff named psychological distress as a factor contributing to overall occupational stress. This group also demonstrated emotional exhaustion, job dissatisfaction, and intention to quit their jobs within the next year, symptoms associated with compassion fatigue.

=== Factors contributing to compassion fatigue in student affairs professionals ===
Student affairs professionals who are more emotionally connected to the students with whom they work and who display an internal locus of control are found to be more likely to develop compassion fatigue as compared to individuals who have an external locus of control and are able to maintain boundaries between themselves and those with whom they work.

== In lawyers ==
Burnout and compassion fatigue can occur in the profession of law; it may occur because of "a discrepancy between expectations and outcomes," or thinking one may have a larger task to achieve than provided resources and support.

Recent research shows that a growing number of attorneys who work with victims of trauma are exhibiting a high rate of compassion fatigue symptoms. In fact, lawyers are four times more likely to suffer from depression than the general public. They also have a higher rate of suicide and substance abuse. Most attorneys, when asked, stated that their formal education lacked adequate training in dealing with trauma. Besides working directly with trauma victims, one of the main reasons attorneys can develop compassion fatigue is because of the demanding case loads, and long hours that are typical to this profession.

== Prevention and mitigation ==
In an effort to prepare and combat compassion fatigue, many organizations have been implementing compassion fatigue and secondary traumatic stress prevention training which educate workers on the occupational risk in helping and protecting professions, raise awareness about symptoms, and teach skills such as coping tools to apply before and after stressful situations, working with integrity, and creating a support system that includes individuals and resources that can provide understanding and are sensitive to the risks of compassion fatigue. Workers also learn how to decompress and destress, utilizing self-care, and traumatic stress reduction tools. Organizational support is an important factor in preventing compassion fatigue, as structured programs and a supportive work environment is associated with increased compassion satisfaction among healthcare workers.

=== Staff education and training ===
Significant improvements in awareness of compassion fatigue and identification of strategies to handle the different stressors are associated with a reduction in symptoms such as feeling significantly less tense, jittery, or overwhelmed, while having increased feelings of being calm and peaceful.

=== Leadership and supervisory training ===
Leaders, managers, and supervisors who possess skills in leading teams exposed to trauma, can mitigate the impact of indirect trauma exposure through such strategies as awareness training, peer support training, applying psychologically safe debriefing methods after potentially traumatizing events, monitoring employee exposure levels, developing incentives, and providing flexibility.

=== Peer support training ===
One-on-one peer support can be applied formally or informally after emotionally challenging or stressful events to lessen the risk of developing compassion fatigue and secondary traumatic stress in team members.

=== Peer support groups ===
Peer support groups have led to participants feeling "less alone" and demonstrating increased interest in learning how to support each other. Participating peers reported feeling more supported, performing better, being healthier, and having a greater likelihood of enjoying extended professional careers.

=== Workplace culture ===
Having a work culture that supports the physical and emotional health of professionals in trauma-exposed roles is critical. Some cited effective workplace changes include encouraging professionals to take some time off, ensuring that professionals eat during their shift, and promoting self achievements to minimize the likelihood of developing compassion fatigue. Although compassion-based interventions have been associated with reduced burnout and increased well-being, their effectiveness may be limited by systemic factors like workload, staffing issues, and institutional support.

=== Social support ===
Social support and emotional support can help practitioners maintain a balance in their worldview. Maintaining a diverse network of social support, from colleagues to pets, promotes a positive psychological state and can protect against STS. Some problems with compassion fatigue stem from a lack of fundamental communication skills; counseling and additional support can be beneficial to practitioners struggling with STS.

=== Therapeutic interventions ===
Various therapeutic interventions are available to address and alleviate symptoms of compassion fatigue including various forms of psychotherapy such as Dialectical Behavior Therapy (DBT) which is commonly used to treat trauma, Eye movement desensitization and reprocessing therapy (EMDR), cognitive behavioral therapy (CBT), somatic or body-based therapy and group support programs.

=== Self-care ===
Stress reduction and anxiety management practices have been shown to be effective in preventing and treating STS. Taking a break from work, participating in breathing exercises, exercising, and other recreational activities all help reduce the stress associated with STS. There is evidence that journaling and meditation can also mediate the effects of STS. Conceptualizing one's own ability with self-integration from a theoretical and practice perspective helps to combat criticized or devalued phase of STS. In addition, establishing clear professional boundaries and accepting the fact that successful outcomes are not always achievable can limit the effects of STS.

=== Self-compassion ===
In order to be the best benefit for clients, practitioners must maintain a state of psychological well-being. Unaddressed compassion fatigue may decrease a practitioners ability to effectively help their clients. Some counselors who use self-compassion as part of their self-care regime have had higher instances of psychological functioning. The counselors use of self-compassion may lessen experiences of vicarious trauma that the counselor might experience through hearing clients stories. Self-compassion as a self-care method is beneficial for both clients and counselors.

=== Mindfulness ===
Self-awareness as a method of self-care might help to alleviate the impact of vicarious trauma (compassion fatigue). Students who took a 15-week course that emphasized stress reduction techniques and the use of mindfulness in clinical practice had significant improvements in therapeutic relationships and counseling skills.

Scales used for assessment	Administration	Measure	Accessible
Professional Quality of Life Measure ProQOL	self-test	compassion satisfaction, burnout, and secondary traumatic stress	online, available
Compassion Fatigue and/Satisfaction Self Test for Helpers	self-test	compassion fatigue	online, available
Maslach Burnout Inventory	administered	burnout	available for purchase

== Compassion fade ==
Compassion fatigue is defined as "the physical and mental exhaustion and emotional withdrawal experienced by those who care for sick or traumatized people over an extended period of time". Compassion fatigue usually occurs with those whom we know; whether that is because of a personal relationship or professional relationship. Compassion fade is defined as terminology to describe the way in which an individual's compassion and empathy are reduced due to the amount or intricacy of the issue. This also includes when the need and tragedy in the world goes up and the amount of desire to help goes down (similar to a see-saw). For example, an individual is more likely to donate more money, time, or other types of assistance to a single person suffering, than to disaster aid or when the population suffering is larger. It is a type of cognitive bias that helps people make their decision to help.

== See also ==
- Bystander effect
- Caregiver stress
- Compassion fatigue in journalism
- Countertransference
- Diffusion of responsibility
- Donor fatigue
- Emotional labor
- Post-traumatic stress disorder
- Self-licensing
- Alexander Mitscherlich / Margarete Mitscherlich: wrote about the "inability to mourn".
