= Vicarious traumatization =

Negative emotional changes in trauma workers

Vicarious trauma (VT) is a term coined by Irene Lisa McCann and Laurie Anne Pearlman to describe how work with traumatized clients affects trauma therapists. The phenomenon has also been known as secondary traumatic stress, a term coined by Charles Figley. In vicarious trauma, the therapist experiences a profound worldview change and is permanently altered by empathetic bonding with a client. This change is thought to have three requirements: empathic engagement and exposure to graphic, traumatizing material; exposure to human cruelty; and the reenactment of trauma in therapy. This can produce changes in a therapist's spirituality, worldview, and self-identity.

Vicarious trauma is a subject of debate by theorists, with some saying that it is based on the concepts of countertransference and compassion fatigue. McCann and Pearlman say that there is probably a relationship to these constructs, but vicarious trauma is distinct. Understanding of the phenomenon is evolving.

== Signs and symptoms ==
Symptoms of vicarious trauma align with those of primary trauma. As professionals attempt to connect with their clients emotionally, the symptoms of vicarious trauma can create emotional disturbances such as sadness, grief, irritability, and mood swings. Signs and symptoms of vicarious trauma parallel those of direct trauma, although they tend to be less intense. Workers with personal-trauma histories may be more vulnerable to VT, although research findings are mixed. Common signs and symptoms include social withdrawal, mood swings, aggression, increased sensitivity to violence, somatic symptoms, sleep difficulties, intrusive imagery, cynicism, sexual difficulties, difficulty managing boundaries with clients, and relationship difficulties which reflect problems with security, trust, esteem, intimacy, and control.

== Contributing factors ==
Vicarious trauma, conceptually based in constructivism, arises from interaction between individuals and their situations. A helper's personal history (including prior traumatic experiences), coping strategies, support network, and other things interact with his or her situation (including work setting, nature of the work, and clientele served) and may trigger vicarious trauma. Individuals respond and adapt to, and cope with, VT differently. It has been suggested that traumatization occurs when one's view of the world, or a feeling of safety, is shattered by hearing about the experiences of a client. This exposure to trauma can interrupt a clinician's daily functioning, reducing their effectiveness.

Anything that interferes with a helper's ability to fulfill his or her responsibility to assist traumatized clients can contribute to vicarious trauma. Many human-service workers report that administrative and bureaucratic factors that are an impediment to their effectiveness influence work satisfaction. Negative aspects of an organization such as reorganization, downsizing in the name of change management, and a lack of resources in the name of lean management contribute to burned-out workers.

Vicarious trauma has also been attributed to the stigmatization of mental-health care by service providers. Stigma leads to an inability to engage in self-care; the service provider may reach burnout and become more likely to experience VT. Research has begun to indicate that vicarious trauma is more prominent in those with a prior history of trauma and adversity. A mental-health provider's defense style might pose a risk factor for vicarious traumatization; mental-health providers with self-sacrificing defense styles have been found to experience increased vicarious traumatization. Among EMS personnel, previous-veteran status increased the likelihood of experiencing vicarious trauma.

== Related concepts ==
Although the term "vicarious trauma" has been used interchangeably with "compassion fatigue", "secondary traumatic stress disorder," "burnout," "countertransference" and "work-related stress," differences exist:

- Unlike compassion fatigue, VT is a theory-based construct. Observable symptoms can begin the process of discovering contributing factors and related signs, symptoms, and adaptations. VT specifies psychological domains that can be affected, rather than specific symptoms. This may more accurately guide preventive measures and interventions, and allow for the accurate development of interventions for multiple domains (such as changes in the balance between psychotherapy and other work-related tasks and changes in self-care practices).
- Countertransference is a psychotherapist's response to a particular client. VT refers to responses across clients and time.
- Unlike burnout, countertransference and work-related stress, VT is specific to trauma workers; a helper will experience trauma-specific difficulties, such as intrusive imagery, that are not part of burnout or countertransference. Burnout and vicarious traumatization overlap regarding emotional exhaustion. A worker may experience both VT and burnout, and each has its own remedies. VT and countertransference may also co-occur, intensifying each other.
- Unlike vicarious trauma, countertransference can provide psychotherapists with important information about their clients.
- Work-related stress is a generic term without a theoretical basis, specific signs and symptoms, contributing factors, or remedies. Burnout and vicarious trauma can co-exist. Countertransference responses may increase vicarious trauma.
- Vicarious post-traumatic growth is not a theory-based construct, but is based on self-reported signs.
- Body-centred countertransference

== Mechanism ==
The posited mechanism for vicarious traumatization is empathy. Different forms of empathy may have different effects on helpers. Batson and his colleagues have conducted research that might aid trauma helpers in managing empathic connection constructively.

== Measurement ==
VT has been measured in a variety of ways. Vicarious trauma is a multifaceted construct, requiring a multifaceted assessment. Aspects of VT that would need to be measured for a full assessment include self-capacities, ego resources, frame of reference (identity, world view, and spirituality), psychological needs, and trauma symptoms. They include:

- Psychological needs, using the Trauma and Attachment Belief Scale
- Self-capacities, using the Inner Experience Questionnaire or the Inventory of Altered Self-Capacities
- Trauma symptoms, using the PTSD Checklist, Impact of Events Scale, Impact of Events Scale-Revised, children's revised Impact of Events Scale (Arabic Version), Trauma Symptom Inventory, Detailed Assessment of Posttraumatic Stress, or the World Assumptions Scale
- Secondary Traumatic Stress Scale is a 17-item, five-point Likert scale that distinguishes between PTSD measures by framing the questions as stressors from exposure to clients.
- The Professional Quality of Life (ProQol) version five, with 30 questions on a five-point Likert scale, measures compassion fatigue and secondary trauma.

Vicarious traumatization may be addressed with awareness, balance, and connection. One set of approaches is coping strategies, which include self-care, rest, escape, and play. A second set of approaches can be grouped as transforming strategies, which aim to help workers create community and find meaning through the work. Within each category, strategies may be applied in one's personal and professional lives. Organizations that provide trauma services can also play a role in mitigating vicarious trauma.

Many simple things increase happiness, which lessens the impact of vicarious traumatization. People who are more socially connected tend to be happier. People who consciously practice gratitude are also shown happier. Creative endeavors that are detached from work also increase happiness. Self-care practices such as yoga, qigong, and sitting meditation have been found helpful. Harvard Business Review, in a case study of traumatization, noted the importance of an organizational culture which values social workers and counselors. Research indicates that clinicians exposed to vicarious trauma need targeted interventions such as respite, increasing self-efficacy, and appropriate professional support increase their resilience and act as a buffer against vicarious trauma.

== Prognosis ==
Children have been found to experience vicarious trauma from trauma experienced by their caregivers and peers. Girls experience VT more than boys, and socioeconomic status and race have been found to predict vicarious trauma symptoms.

Counselors and other mental-health professionals have been found to experience vicarious trauma when working with veterans and others who have experienced trauma. Factors that predict vicarious-trauma severity include professional trauma, level of peer supervision, population served by the clinician, defense mechanisms of the therapist, emotional coping strategies, and social-support availability. Foster parents have also been found to experience vicarious trauma related to the trauma of their children. Several studies have found that foster parents experience vicarious trauma, burnout and compassion fatigue, and report emotional disengagement (a common symptom of VT) as a coping strategy.

== See also ==
- Allostatic load
- Emotional labor
- Historical trauma
- W. H. R. Rivers
- Secondary traumatic stress
- Vicarious trauma after viewing media
