= Youth Violence and Juvenile Justice =

- Discipline: Criminology, juvenile law
- Language: English
- Edited by: Eric J. Connolly, Peter S. Lehmann

Publication details
- History: 2003-present
- Publisher: SAGE Publications
- Frequency: Quarterly
- Impact factor: 1.796 (2017)

Standard abbreviations
- ISO 4: Youth Violence Juv. Justice

Indexing
- ISSN: 1541-2040 (print); 1556-9330 (web)
- LCCN: 2002214769
- OCLC no.: 50304560

Links
- Journal homepage; Online access; Online archive

Youth Violence and Juvenile Justice is a quarterly peer-reviewed academic journal that covers the field of criminology and juvenile law. Its Co-editors are Eric J. Connolly and Peter S. Lehmann (Sam Houston State University). It was established in 2003 and is currently published by SAGE Publications.

== Abstracting and indexing ==
Youth Violence and Juvenile Justice is abstracted and indexed in Scopus and the Social Sciences Citation Index. According to the Journal Citation Reports, its 2017 impact factor is 1.796, ranking it 23 out of 61 journals in the category "Criminology & Penology".
