= Jonathan Shay =

American clinical psychiatrist

- Born: 1941 (age 84–85)
- Education: University of Pennsylvania
- Known for: Research on complex post-traumatic stress disorder, Homeric literature
- Awards: MacArthur Fellows Program (2007); Salem Award (2010)
- Scientific career
- Fields: Psychiatry
- Workplaces: Veterans Administration, Boston (1987–2008)

Jonathan Shay (born 1941) is an American doctor and clinical psychiatrist. He holds a B.A. from Harvard (1963), and an M.D. (1971) and a Ph.D. (1972) from the University of Pennsylvania. He is best known for his publications comparing the experiences of Vietnam veterans with the descriptions of war and homecoming in Homer's Iliad and Odyssey.

== Work with Vietnam veterans ==
Shay's early medical work was laboratory research on how central nervous system cells are affected by strokes, but after suffering a stroke himself, he went to work for the United States Department of Veterans' Affairs outpatient clinic in Boston. While working there, in his words, "The veterans simply kidnapped me," and his work with them "utterly redirected my life."

In 1987, Shay shifted from neuropathology to the study of posttraumatic stress disorder (PTSD) and published a short article linking the combat histories of patients at the VA with the experience of war described in Homer's Iliad. He was then approached by classics professor Gregory Nagy who suggested that the topic might be expanded into a full-length book on the nature and treatment of PTSD.

He has written two books, Achilles in Vietnam: Combat Trauma and the Undoing of Character (1994) and Odysseus in America: Combat Trauma and the Trials of Homecoming (2002), which discuss PTSD by reference to the experiences of American veterans of the Vietnam War, and the experiences depicted in the Iliad and the Odyssey. Shay's research uncovered what may be the earliest historical reference to PTSD, in Lady Percy's soliloquy in Henry IV, Part 1 (act 2, scene 3, lines 40-62). Written around 1597, it represents an unusually accurate description of the symptom constellation of PTSD.

Shay has also done research on the use of Prozac in treating PTSD in Vietnam veterans.

== Views on PTSD ==
Shay writes, "For years I have agitated against the diagnostic jargon 'Posttraumatic stress disorder' because transparently we are dealing with an injury, not an illness, malady, disease, sickness, or disorder."

Shay argues that PTSD is not an illness but the persistence of adaptive behaviors needed to survive in a stressful environment. For example, emotional numbing is useful in a disaster situation and maladaptive in a family setting, and loss of trust enhances survival in a prison but not in a community setting. Like Derek Summerfield, he also argues against labeling and patronizing treatment. Shay recommends that we resocialize trauma survivors as a means of promoting socially acceptable behavior patterns. He cites classical Greek theater and the collective mourning described in the Iliad as possible precedents. In Odysseus in America he writes of "the circle of communalization of trauma": "When trauma survivors hear that enough of the truth of their experience has been understood, remembered and retold with enough fidelity to carry some of this truth ... then the circle of communalization is complete."

=== Prevention of PTSD ===
Shay is a passionate advocate of improved mental health treatment for soldiers and of more vigorous efforts to prevent PTSD, in addition to structural reform of the ways the U.S. armed forces are organized, trained, and counseled. He has collaborated with General James Jones, the past commandant of the Marines, and Major General James Mattis of the Marines. He has promoted the concept of preventative psychiatry in support of military cohesion, leadership and training:

Prevention of psychological and moral injury in military service has three axes: cohesion, leadership, and training. First is keep people together. Train them together, send them into danger together, bring them home together, and give them time together to digest what they've just been through ... The second axis is expert, ethical, and properly supported leadership ... The third axis of prevention is prolonged, progressive, realistic training for what the troops have to do and face.

== Concept of moral injury ==
Shay introduced the concept of "Moral injury" and recommended treatment strategies for it in his two books. Moral injury is a distinct syndrome from (but often co-morbid with) PTSD and is one of the primary themes for the veterans described in his books, often leading to personality changes and obstructing successful treatment.

Shay writes that his "current most precise (and narrow) definition of moral injury has three parts. Moral injury is present when (1) there has been a betrayal of what is morally correct; (2) by someone who holds legitimate authority; and (3) in a high-stakes situation." Factor (2) is an instance of Shay's concept of "leadership malpractice". Other authors have alternative definitions where (2) is by the individual.

== Career recognition ==
Shay is respected in military circles, having conducted the Commandant of the Marine Corps Trust Study (1999–2000); serving as visiting scholar-at-large at the U.S. Naval War College (2001); Chair of Ethics, Leadership, and Personnel Policy in the Office of the U.S. Army Deputy Chief of Staff for Personnel; and was Omar Bradley Chair of Strategic Leadership at the US Army War College and Dickinson College (2008–2009).

In 2007 he received a MacArthur "Genius Grant" fellowship. In 2010 he was awarded the Salem Award for Human Rights and Social Justice for "building public awareness and acceptance of post-traumatic stress disorder as a serious and bona fide war injury."

In 2018, Volunteers of America established The Shay Moral Injury Center, named in his honor and dedicated to deepening understanding about moral injury in the many populations who experience it.
