= Charles Figley =

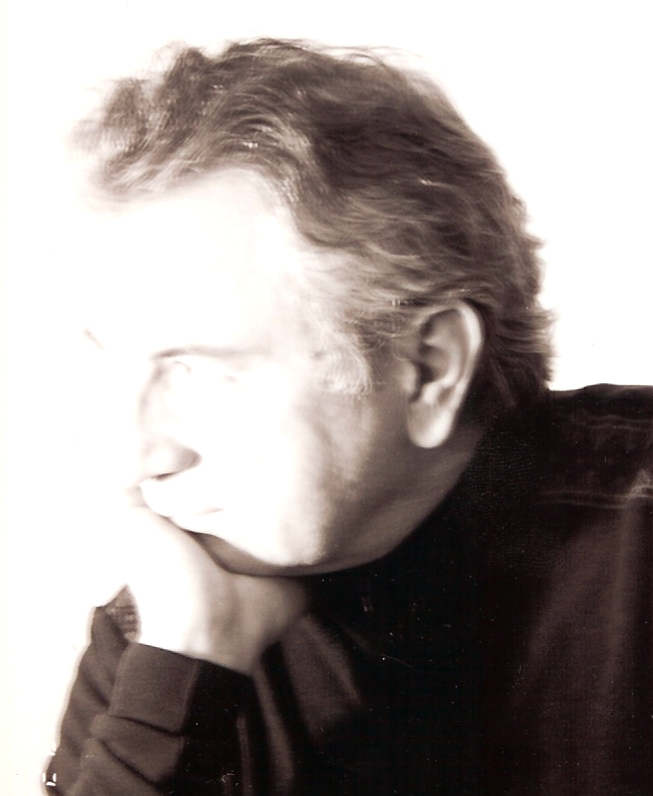
Charles Figley

Charles Figley is an American university professor in the fields of psychology, family therapy, psychoneuroimmunology family studies, social work, traumatology, and mental health. He is the Paul Henry Kurzweg, MD Distinguished Chair in Disaster Mental Health and Graduate School of Social Work Professor at Tulane University (formerly a distinguished professor at Florida State University where he was the Traumatology Institute Director). He was a full professor and Traumatology Institute Director at the Florida State University (FSU) College of Social Work. Figley became a Purdue University Full Professor in 1983 with a courtesy appointment in the Department of Psychological Sciences.

Figley received both of his graduate degrees from the Pennsylvania State University and his undergraduate degree from the University of Hawaii, all in the area of human development.

== Trauma research ==
Figley is the director of the Tulane University Traumatology Institute, which carries out research focusing on human stress responses, traumatic stress injuries, resilience, and secondary trauma measurement and management.

He was the editor in chief of Traumatology, an international peer-reviewed journal of traumatology from 1994 to 2012.

== Green Cross ==
Figley is the founder of the Green Cross Academy of Traumatology. The organization has provided traumatology services following major disasters including the September 11, 2001 terrorist attacks in New York City, the 2004 tsunami in the Indian Ocean, and the Virginia Tech massacre.

== Veterans service work ==
Figley is a founding member of both the national and Florida State University chapters of the Collegiate Veterans Association. Figley currently serves as the faculty advisor for the FSU Alpha chapter of the Collegiate Veterans Association (CVA).

In 2007, Figley hosted the 2nd Annual Combat Stress Symposium, a peer-reviewed educational symposium studying the effects of combat stress on the U.S. military. Editorial board and keynote speakers included Figley, William Nash, M.D., MC, USN (United States Marine Corps), Zahava Solomon, PhD, MSW (Tel-Aviv University), Albert "Skip" Rizzo, Ph.D. (University of Southern California), and Ken Graap (Virtually Better of Decatur, Georgia). Panelists included Martell Teasley, Ph.D. (Florida State University); Warren R. "Rocky" McPherson (Former Executive Director of the Florida Department of Veterans Affairs); Shad Meshad, LCSW (National Veterans Foundation); Nancy Clayton, M.D. (former Navy psychiatrist treating combat Marines); Raymond Scurfield, DSW (University of Southern Mississippi); CAPT Bob Koffman, MC, USN (Navy Bureau of Medicine); Tom Gaskin, Ph.D., (US Marine Corps).
