= Lisa James =

American clinical psychologist and neuroscientist

- Education: Boston University; Florida State University
- Occupations: Clinical psychologist and neuroscientist

Lisa James is an American clinical psychologist and a neuroscientist who works in the Departments of Neuroscience and Psychology at the University of Minnesota Medical School. She is also the Anita Kunin Professor of Healthy Brain Aging at the Brain Sciences Center at the Minneapolis VA Medical Center. In addition to research on post-traumatic stress disorders (PTSD) and resilience, she runs the longitudinal study for The Minnesota Women Healthy Aging Project.

== Education ==
James received her BA in psychology from Boston University in 1999. She then went on to study Clinical Psychology at Florida State University where she received her MA and Ph.D. in 2009.

== Scientific career ==
James was a postdoctoral fellow at the Neurobehavioral Research Laboratory and Clinic at the University of Texas Health Sciences Center at San Antonio, San Antonio, TX before moving to Minnesota where she passed the clinical psychology Minnesota state board and is now a licensed clinical psychologist. James is currently an Adjunct Associate Professor in both the Department of Neuroscience and the Department of Neuroscience at the University of Minnesota. While at the University of Minnesota, she teamed up with Apostolos P. Georgopoulos on The Minnesota Women Healthy Aging Project to design a longitudinal study of how aging affects women's brains.

James' research has demonstrated the role of ApoE protecting the brain from traumatic stress and highlighted the role of immunity in brain health. She has published results showing that alleles of the human leukocyte antigen DR13 impact brain health and shown a correlation of DRB13*02 with reduced loss of brain loss.
