= The Gifted One =

1989 American TV film

- Title card
- Genre: Fantasy
- Written by: Lisa James; Richard Rothstein
- Directed by: Stephen Herek
- Starring: Peter Kowanko; John Rhys-Davies; G.W. Bailey
- Theme music composer: J. Peter Robinson
- Country of origin: United States
- Original language: English

Production
- Executive producer: Richard Rothstein
- Producer: Ariel Levy
- Production location: Phoenix, Arizona
- Cinematography: Don McCuaig; Kees Van Oostrum
- Editors: Larry Bock; Gib Jaffe
- Running time: 96 minutes
- Production companies: NBC Productions; Richard Rothstein Productions

Original release
- Network: NBC
- Release: June 25, 1989

The Gifted One is a 1989 American fantasy television film that aired on NBC on June 25, 1989.

== Plot ==
A young boy has the capability to use his body energy to heal people, and detect illnesses. After growing up, he escapes from the scientists studying him in order to learn about his past and discover how he came to have this ability. While on the run, he detects an aneurysm in the neck of a child and attempts to convince his skeptical parents to seek medical attention for him.

== Cast ==
- Peter Kowanko as Michael Grant
- John Rhys-Davies as Carl Boardman
- G. W. Bailey as Dr. Winslow
- Wendy Phillips as Sarah Grant
- Gregg Henry as Jack
- Kristopher Kent Hill as Billy Farady
- James Eric as Tom Farady
- Shano Palovich as Beth Farady
- Lucky Hayes as Mrs. Williams
- Charles Benton as Mr. Williams
- Dey Young as Susan Martin
- Dale Swann as Gordon Thomas
- Rose Weaver as Dr. Claire Henry
- Stephen Hastings as Dr. Hart
- Jim Newcomer as Dr. James
- Spensley Schroder as Dr. Solomon
- Kenneth Bridges as Dr. Helfen
- Doughlas Cotner as Dr. Richards
- Anthony Bolden as Technician
- Mason Arnold as Tommy
- Chris Balcerzak as Johnny
- Larry Bartels as Baseball Player
- Arell Blanton as Guard
- Brandon Call as Michael (age 10)
- Thomas Callaway as John Grant
- Cole Coxon as Baby Michael
- Joe El Rady as Frankie
- Jackson Douglas Fischer as Doctor
- Tami French as Hannah
- Sanford Gibbons as Policeman #1
- Khrystyne Haje as Mary Joe
- Christina Herczeg as Little Girl (Carol)
- Hank Lawrence as Big Lou
- Chris Livesay as Bobby
- Michael Mancini as Umpire
- Mark Manning as Principal
- Norm McBride as Coach
- Christopher Michael as Bobby
- Emily Ragsdale as Nurse
- Steven Suggs as Jeffrey
- Joanthan Voyce as Policeman #2

== Broadcast ==
The film aired on NBC at 9:00 p.m. EDT on Sunday, June 25, 1989.
