= Battlemind =

Battlemind is both the mental orientation developed during a combat zone deployment and a program developed at Walter Reed Army Institute of Research (WRAIR) intended to reduce its impact on personal post-deployment issues.

== Mental orientation ==
In the definition provided by the U.S. Army Medical Command

"Battlemind is the Soldier's inner strength to face fear and adversity with courage. Key components include:

1. Self confidence: taking calculated risks and handling challenges.
2. Mental toughness: overcoming obstacles or setbacks and maintaining positive thoughts during times of adversity and challenge."

The significance of Battlemind in the Medical Command's context is that "Battlemind skills helped you survive in combat, but may cause you problems if not adapted when you get home."

Initial writings on the subject focused on the utility of battlemind while in service, while several recent works focus on treatment and self-help.

== Program ==
The first Battlemind product was a mental health post-deployment briefing. It quickly became a training system supporting soldiers and families across the seven phases of the deployment cycle.

The Battlemind system now includes separate pre-deployment training modules for soldiers, unit leaders, health care providers and spouses. Psychological debriefings are given in theater and upon redeployment. There is also a post-deployment module for spouses and several post-deployment modules for soldiers.

== Controversy ==
Some veteran groups have expressed concern or curiosity about the effectiveness of the Battlemind program in addressing post traumatic stress disorder.
