= Extreme weather post-traumatic stress disorder =

Mental disorder associated with severe weather

Extreme weather events can have a significant impact on mental health, particularly in the form of post-traumatic stress disorder (PTSD). Extreme weather post-traumatic stress disorder occurs when someone experiences the symptoms of PTSD due to extreme weather events, such as thunderstorms, tornadoes, hurricanes, blizzards, floods, and wildfires.

== Background ==
=== Post-traumatic stress disorder (PTSD) ===
Post-traumatic stress disorder (PTSD) is a condition caused by past, life-altering events in which people have experienced or witnessed. Events could include a serious accident, physical or sexual violence, combat, or natural disasters. Recently, studies have found that extreme weather also leads to PTSD. Symptoms of PTSD related to extreme weather events can include replaying flashbacks of an event, having greater anxiety, and/or detachment when thinking about an event. Symptoms can also arise months or years after the extreme weather event occurs.

=== Extreme weather events ===
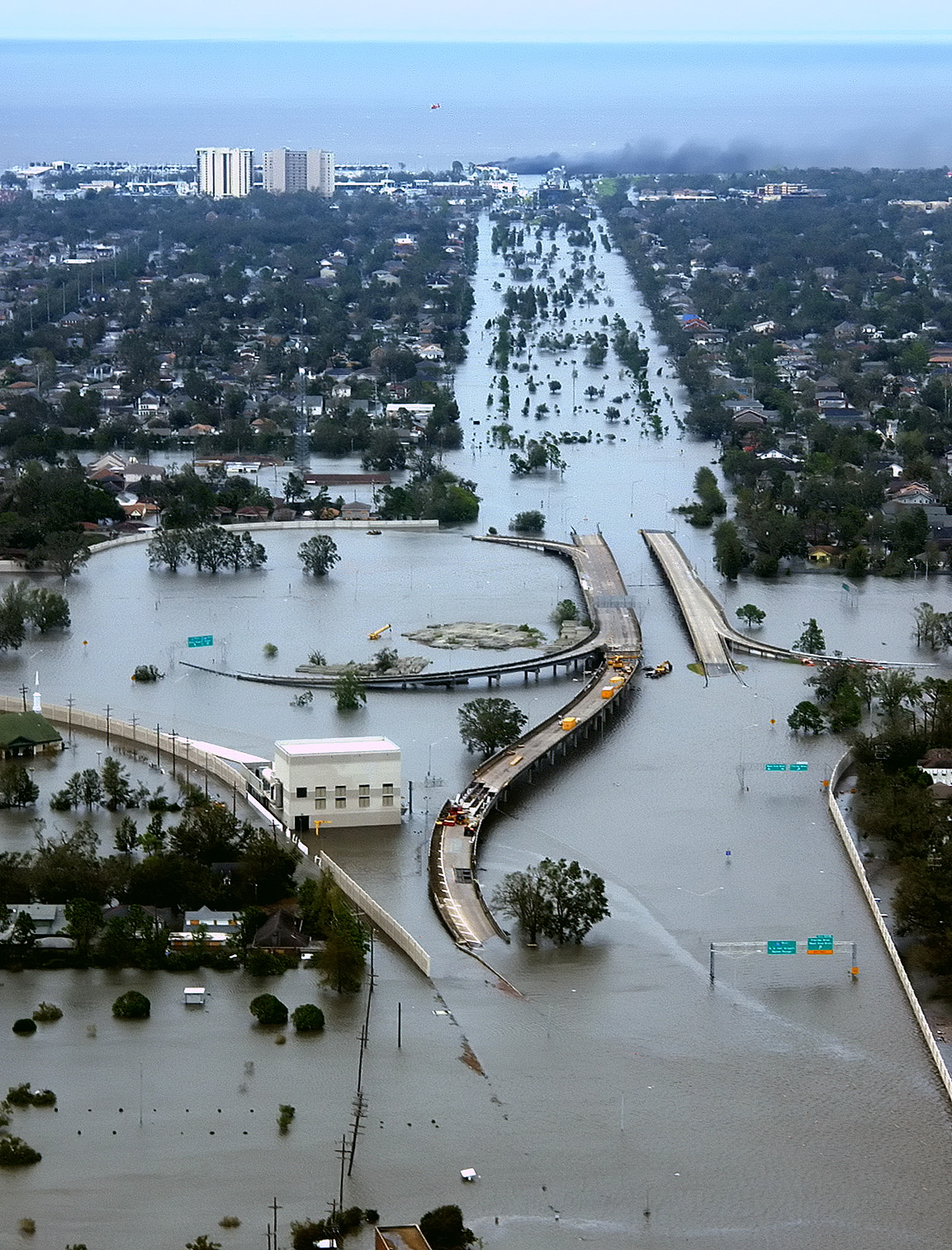
New Orleans Flooded after Hurricane Katrina

Examples of extreme weather events include tropical storms, hurricanes, heat waves, droughts, and floods. These events have been growing in frequency in the past few decades due to climate change. With this growing frequency, it will increase the effects of these events onto humans and society in the future. People who are exposed to life threatening situations, including extreme weather events, are at a greater risk of experiencing PTSD symptoms or developing the disease. Experiencing or knowing someone who experienced an injury from a natural disaster increased the likelihood and frequency of PTSD symptoms. Also, experiencing a close death of a family member in relation to the natural disaster or weather event often led to a higher likelihood of PTSD.

== Symptoms ==
=== Eco-anxiety ===
Eco-anxiety is a term that describes one's reaction to the ever changing and worsening environmental conditions. One is constantly worried or scared of the eventual doom of the Earth and our society. There are sustained effects on the effects of individuals, as well as the increase in eco-anxiety as a health condition. This has led to increased mental health issues in response to climate change, thus allowing for more research to be developed on the topic.

=== Suicide ===
Among other issues, the effects of climate change and extreme weather can lead to an increase in suicide rates. This can be experienced both when one experiences an extreme weather event, but also due to the uncertainty of the future, in relation to climate change.

Research has shown that there is a connection between farmer suicide rates and the occurrence of a drought. Droughts can lead to crop failure, inflation/economic hardships, prolonged heat exposure, and relocating which can overall accumulate high stress levels leading to more suicide attempts amongst farmers.

There have also been many association between suicide, especially violent, and the increase in temperature due to global warming.

=== Violence ===
It has been shown that there is a relationship between heat and violence, especially after heat waves. Therefore, it can be assumed that an increase in global temperature can lead to an increase in cases of violence. People experience an increase in aggressive behavior due to an increase in temperature, which can lead to violence or other mental health problems.

=== Post-traumatic growth ===
Post-traumatic growth is a term used to describe the change that can occur after a traumatic event, in which the person experiences adaptation, growth, and a new sense of living. It is a positive reaction to one's experience of a negative event, in which one would want to change their life, or others lives for the better. Post-traumatic growth can occur after a traumatic event, including extreme weather events. When someone is given social support after an event, they are more likely to experience post-traumatic growth.

== Prevalence ==
PTSD surpasses depression and anxiety as the most common mental health outcome from extreme weather events. This phenomenon has been studied on global, regional, and local scales.

Climate-related disasters and exposures including drought, extreme temperature, floods, landslides, storms, and precipitation have various mental health outcomes, but PTSD is consistently the most commonly reported among low and middle-income countries. Across weather events, PTSD ranks highest among victims before depression and anxiety. PTSD in a flooded setting and PTSD in a storm setting are among the top three most common combinations of mental health outcomes and extreme weather events. This trend can be seen throughout many countries in South America and Asia where there are significant increases in PTSD for individuals exposed to floods and storms compared to unexposed groups.

Populations in the UK that have been exposed to flood events have higher rates of diagnoses than the general population. The most common problem associated with flooding is PTSD (30.4%), surpassing depression (21.3%) and anxiety (19.8%).

Current research focuses on PTSD associated with floods and storms. Knowledge about other events such as droughts, heatwaves, landslides, and precipitation is more limited. Further investigation is needed to determine the prevalence of PTSD in the instance of these various events and to identify which symptoms of PTSD correspond to which extreme weather incidents.

== Risk factors ==
The Intergovernmental Panel on Climate Change has connected climate change to extreme weather events as a reason for concern, which has been transitioned from a high to very high risk at near term warming with medium confidence. Negative mental health effects due to climate change are predicted with very high confidence globally, and the association with trauma from extreme weather events is also evaluated with very high confidence. As different events of extreme weather can cause extreme weather PTSD, and extreme weather is expected to increase globally, there is an enormous scale of people who may be affected by extreme weather PTSD. In an analysis of extreme weather events and mental health reviewing floods, droughts, storms, and heatwaves, PTSD rates as a result of these events ranged from 2.6% to 90% and results vary due to populations, disaster type, and study characteristics, and cross-cultural applications of PTSD diagnoses.

=== Vulnerable populations ===
There are many factors that increase vulnerability as well. Low and middle-income countries are more vulnerable due to the interaction of inadequate mental healthcare and increased vulnerability to the effects of climate related disasters. Specifically, flood and storm related PTSD are observed frequently for people residing in low and middle income areas impacted by climate disasters. Other vulnerable groups to extreme weather mental health effects include the economically disadvantaged, elderly, disabled, prisoners, substance abusers, and children. Children are particularly vulnerable because the mental health impacts of extreme weather can contribute not only to PTSD, but to infectious and chronic disease susceptibility as well as cognitive deficits, lower IQ and dementia later in life. Extreme weather events also force migration in many situations and PTSD is found in higher rates among refugees and forced migrant populations and there are more barriers to receiving treatment such as affordability, information on available services, and cultural or language barriers.

== Treatments and solutions ==
There are many treatment and prevention tactics available for extreme weather-related PTSD. Individual conditions and psychological behavior, government action, secondary stressors, and weather events make the assessment of interventions difficult. Some interventions have proven relatively ineffective while others have produced more successful outcomes.

One possible treatment for extreme weather PTSD is psychological debriefing, but this has been shown to be an ineffective intervention for flood events. Prolonged exposure (PE), cognitive processing therapy (CPT), and cognitive therapy for PTSD (CT-PTSD) all significantly reduce PTSD symptoms in research and clinical settings. Emotional processing theory is the basis for PE. PE employs emotional processing techniques to activate trauma memory and modify the patient's pathological fear structure. CPT utilizes social cognitive theory (SCT) to consider the patient's cognitions, emotions, and behavior in the context of the trauma. CPT reduces symptoms of PTSD through cognitive restructuring. CT-PTSD is based on the theory that individuals afflicted with PTSD maintain a sense of a serious and current threat. Patients work to modify assessments of current threats, reduce dysfunctional cognitive strategies, and elaborate their trauma memory through a wide range of behavioral activation assignments.

Treatment that is accessible to everyone includes social support. Social support has been shown in the past to prevent the severity of post-traumatic stress symptoms. A recent study reported that individuals who are self-compassionate experienced fewer post-traumatic stress symptoms after a weather-related traumatic event because of perceived increased social support. Free resources such as the Disaster Distress Helpline (1-800-985-5990) are also available 24/7 for support by providing confidential counseling and coping mechanisms in order to reduce PTSD symptoms.

== Prevention and preparedness ==
Prevention and preparedness tactics include enhanced risk communication, mental health literacy and first aid, and government planning. Incorporating flood risk and management infrastructure in urban design is an effective mode of prevention for PTSD. Establishing resilience by allocating resources and encouraging community growth is also an effective tactic for reducing associated flood risks, especially among more vulnerable populations.

Learning about storms and weather forecasts, creating safety plans, preparing in advance, and identifying your stressors in consideration to specific natural disasters can give you a sense of control. This ultimately can lessen the mental turmoil associated with these situations.

Policy-based solutions such as enhanced monitoring of mental health and greater access to mental health resources have been shown to help effectively prepare for PTSD due to extreme weather events. Prevention planning for PTSD within the healthcare system can include increasing funding and encouraging mental health training for professionals in the field, both of which have produced beneficial outcomes. Establishing a robust and well-trained mental health force is a productive step in resilience planning and adaptation.

Traditionally, mental health research has focused on high-income countries, excluding vulnerable populations. Low and middle-income countries are more burdened by exposure and vulnerabilities to extreme weather events, therefore a useful step in PTSD preparation and planning is expanding research among these populations.

The Intergovernmental Panel on Climate Change has suggested increased mental health services as well as surveillance and monitoring of mental health impacts of extreme weather and other climate change related mental health effects as a potential solution (Intergovernmental Panel on Climate Change, p. 25). As extreme weather events grow stronger and more prevalent, the incorporation of treatments, solutions, prevention, and preparedness will be an important step for mitigating extreme weather PTSD.

== Examples of extreme weather events ==
Many extreme weather events from the recent past have led to many new cases of Extreme Weather PTSD. Presented below are a list of extreme weather events and the prevalence of PTSD in the aftermath.

=== Hurricane Katrina ===
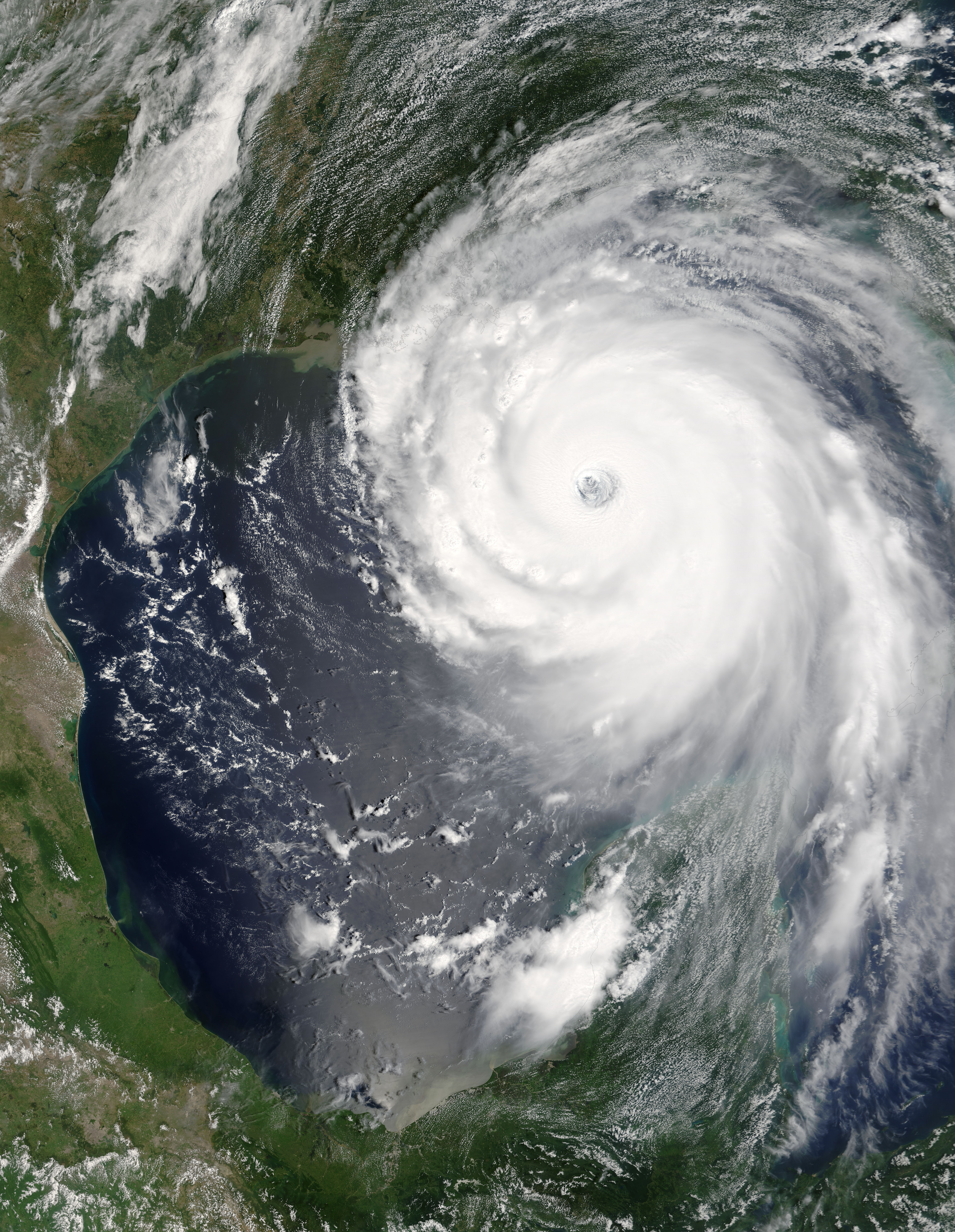
Hurricane Katrina

A study researching the impact of Katrina on low income parents showed that over half of participants showed probable symptoms of PTSD. Another study showed that most adults that did develop PTSD had still not recovered after approximately two years. Many survivors continued to experience mental health issues even ten years after the tragedy.

=== New York and New Jersey, United States flood ===
Hurricane Sandy was a post-tropical cyclone and flooding event in the New York City area causing $19 billion in damages and 43 deaths. Prevalence of PTSD following Hurricane Sandy was 2.0%.

=== UK flooding and heat waves ===
PTSD after extreme weather events leading to flooding in the United Kingdom was recorded at 30.36%.

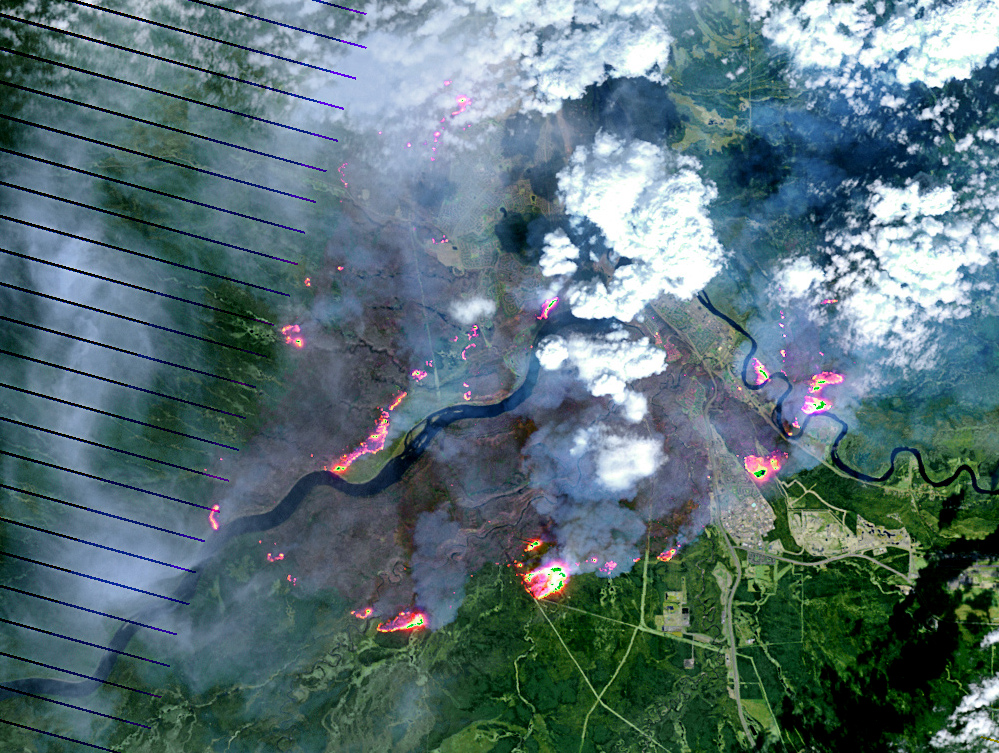
Wildfire spreads in Fort McMurray.

=== Fort McMurray, Canada wildfires ===
After wildfires caused the evacuation of 90,000 residents of Fort McMurray, Canada, and the destruction of 10% of housing, PTSD afflicted 39.6% of those affected.

=== Krymsk, Russia flooding and droughts ===
PTSD was expected to be a long term effect of the Krymsk area after flooding in 2012 after warning signs were found in residents during the following weeks.

=== Tamil Nadu, India flooding ===
After particularly high intensity rainfall and the overflowing of neighboring rivers in Tamil Nadu, 26.9% of the studied population were diagnosed with PTSD.
