= Post-traumatic stress disorder =

Mental disorder associated with trauma

- Specialty: Psychiatry, clinical psychology
- Symptoms: Disturbing thoughts, feelings, or dreams related to the event; mental or physical distress to trauma-related cues; efforts to avoid trauma-related situations; increased fight-or-flight response
- Complications: Suicide; self-harm, cardiac, respiratory, musculoskeletal, gastrointestinal, immunological disorders
- Duration: > 1 month (Note: At least 1 month of symptoms for clinical diagnosis is required, while symptoms may persist from 6 months to multiple years.)
- Causes: Exposure to a traumatic event
- Diagnostic method: Based on symptoms
- Treatment: Counseling, medication, selective serotonin reuptake inhibitors
- Frequency: 8.7% (lifetime risk); 3.5% (12-month risk) (US)

Post-traumatic stress disorder (PTSD) (Note: Acceptable variants of this term exist; see the Terminology section in this article.) is a mental disorder that develops from experiencing a traumatic event. Examples include sexual assault, domestic violence, child abuse, warfare along its associated traumas, natural disaster, bereavement, traffic collision, or other traumatic events on a person's life or well-being. Symptoms may include disturbing thoughts, feelings, or dreams related to the events, mental or physical distress to trauma-related cues, attempts to avoid trauma-related cues, alterations in the way a person thinks and feels, and an increase in the fight-or-flight response. These symptoms last for more than a month after the event and can include triggers such as misophonia. Young children are less likely to show distress, but instead may express their memories through play.

Most people who experience traumatic events do not develop PTSD. People who experience interpersonal violence such as rape, other sexual assaults, being kidnapped, stalking, physical abuse by an intimate partner, and childhood abuse are more likely to develop PTSD than those who experience non-assault based trauma, such as accidents and natural disasters. In the United States, about 3.5% of adults have PTSD in a given year, and 9% of people develop it at some point in their lives. In much of the rest of the world, rates during a given year are between 0.5% and 1%. Higher rates may occur in regions of armed conflict. It is more common in women than men.

A recent systematic review and meta-analysis reported that the pooled prevalence rates for ICD-11 PTSD and complex PTSD were 2% and 4%, respectively, among adults in non-war-exposed/economically developed countries/regions; they increased to 6% and 15%, respectively, in war-exposed/less economically developed countries/regions.

Prevention may be possible when counselling is necessary for those with early symptoms, but is not effective when provided to all trauma-exposed individuals regardless of whether symptoms are present. The main treatments for people with PTSD are counselling (psychotherapy) and medication. Most combination therapy (psychotherapy and pharmacotherapy) does not seem to be more effective than psychotherapy alone, except for possibly MDMA-assisted psychotherapy. Benefits from medication are less than those seen with counselling. Antidepressants of the SSRI or SNRI type are the first-line medications used for PTSD and are moderately beneficial for about half of people. Medications, other than some SSRIs or SNRIs, do not have enough evidence to support their use and, in the case of benzodiazepines, may worsen outcomes.

Symptoms of trauma-related mental disorders have been documented since at least the time of the ancient Greeks. A few instances of evidence of post-traumatic illness have been argued to exist from the seventeenth and eighteenth centuries, such as the diary of Samuel Pepys, who described intrusive and distressing symptoms following the 1666 Fire of London. During the world wars, the condition was known under various terms, including "shell shock", "war nerves", neurasthenia and 'combat neurosis'. The term "post-traumatic stress disorder" came into use in the 1970s, in large part due to the diagnoses of U.S. military veterans of the Vietnam War. It was officially recognized by the American Psychiatric Association in 1980 in the third edition of the Diagnostic and Statistical Manual of Mental Disorders (DSM-III). alongside a growing body of clinical literature on Vietnam War veterans.

== Terminology ==
The Diagnostic and Statistical Manual of Mental Disorders does not hyphenate "post" and "traumatic", thus, the DSM-5 lists the disorder as posttraumatic stress disorder. However, many scientific journal articles and other scholarly publications do hyphenate the name of the disorder, viz., "post-traumatic stress disorder". Dictionaries also differ concerning the preferred spelling of the disorder with the Collins English Dictionary – Complete and Unabridged using the hyphenated spelling, and the American Heritage Dictionary of the English Language, Fifth Edition and the Random House Kernerman Webster's College Dictionary giving the non-hyphenated spelling.

Some authors have used the terms "post-traumatic stress syndrome" or "post-traumatic stress symptoms" ("PTSS"), or simply "post-traumatic stress" ("PTS") in the case of the U.S. Department of Defense, to avoid stigma associated with the word "disorder".

Other terms for PTSD in the English-speaking world include bossies, used during the South African Border War.

== Signs and symptoms ==
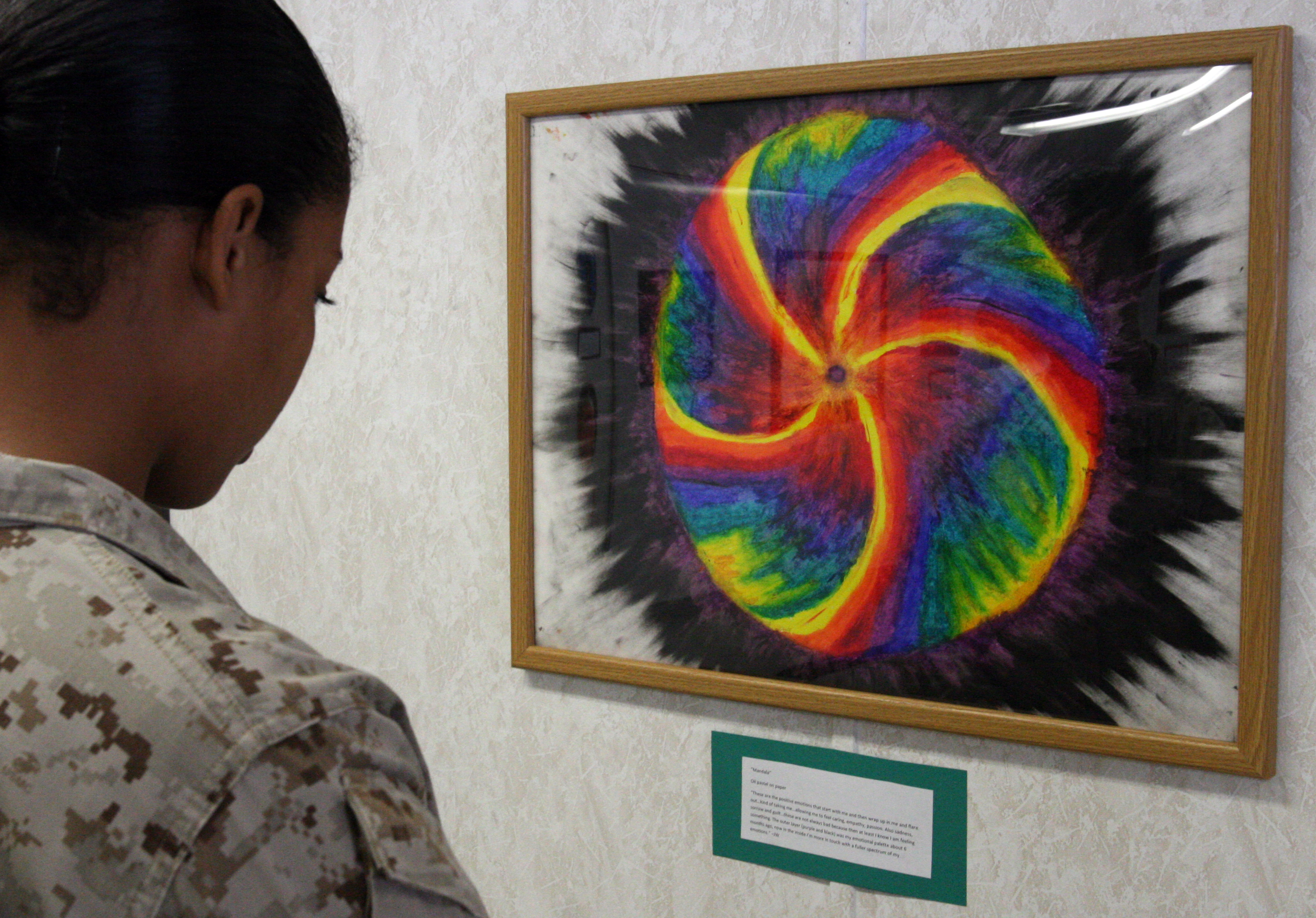
Service members use art to relieve PTSD symptoms.

Symptoms of PTSD generally begin within the first three months after the inciting traumatic event, but may not begin until years later. In the typical case, the individual with PTSD persistently avoids either trauma-related thoughts and emotions or discussion of the traumatic event and may even have amnesia of the event (dissociative amnesia). However, the event is commonly relived by the individual through intrusive, recurrent recollections, dissociative episodes of reliving the trauma ("flashbacks"), and nightmares (50–70%). While it is common to have symptoms after any traumatic event, these must persist to a sufficient degree (i.e., causing dysfunction in life or clinical levels of distress) for longer than one month after the trauma to be classified as PTSD (clinically significant dysfunction or distress for less than one month after the trauma may be acute stress disorder). Some following a traumatic event experience post-traumatic growth. The social interactions of people experiencing trauma may influence their PTSD symptoms, including critical comments by partners making the victim feel guilty.

=== Associated medical conditions ===
Trauma survivors often develop depression, anxiety disorders, and mood disorders in addition to PTSD. More than 50% of those with PTSD have co-morbid anxiety, mood, or substance use disorders.

Substance use disorders, such as alcohol use disorder, commonly co-occur with PTSD. Recovery from post-traumatic stress disorder or other anxiety disorders may be hindered, or the condition worsened, when substance use disorders are comorbid with PTSD. Resolving these problems can bring about improvement in an individual's mental health status and anxiety levels.

PTSD has a strong association with tinnitus, and speculation exists that PTSD may cause some tinnitus seen in association with the condition.

PTSD is also associated with several physical health comorbidities that involve inflammatory processes and immune system dysregulation.

In children and adolescents, there is a strong association between emotional regulation difficulties (e.g., mood swings, anger outbursts, temper tantrums) and post-traumatic stress symptoms, independent of age, gender, or type of trauma.

Moral injury, the feeling of moral distress, such as shame or guilt following a moral transgression, is associated with PTSD but is distinguished from it. Moral injury is associated with shame and guilt, while PTSD is associated with anxiety and fear.

== Risk factors ==
Persons considered at risk for developing PTSD include combat military personnel, survivors of natural disasters, concentration camp survivors, and survivors of violent crime. Persons employed in occupations that expose them to violence (such as soldiers) or disasters (such as emergency service workers) are also at risk. Other occupations at an increased risk include police officers, firefighters, first responders, ambulance personnel, health care professionals, train drivers, divers, journalists, and sailors, as well as people who work at banks, post offices, or in stores. The intensity of the traumatic event is also associated with a subsequent risk of developing PTSD, with experiences related to witnessed death, or witnessed or experienced torture, injury, bodily disfigurement, traumatic brain injury being highly associated with the development of PTSD. Similarly, experiences that are unexpected or in which the victim cannot escape are also associated with a high risk of developing PTSD.

=== Trauma ===
PTSD has been associated with a wide range of traumatic events. The risk of developing PTSD after a traumatic event varies by trauma type and is the highest following exposure to torture (40%) and sexual violence (11.4%), particularly rape (19.0%). Men are more likely to experience a traumatic event (of any type), but women are more likely to experience the kind of high-impact traumatic event that can lead to PTSD, such as interpersonal violence and sexual assault.

Motor vehicle collision survivors, both children and adults, are at an increased risk of PTSD. Globally, about 2.6% of adults are diagnosed with PTSD following a non-life-threatening traffic accident, and a similar proportion of children develop PTSD. Risk of PTSD almost doubles to 4.6% for life-threatening auto accidents. Females were more likely to be diagnosed with PTSD following a road traffic accident, whether the accident occurred during childhood or adulthood.

Post-traumatic stress reactions have been studied in children and adolescents. The rate of PTSD might be lower in children than adults, but in the absence of therapy, symptoms may continue for decades. One estimate suggests that the proportion of children and adolescents having PTSD in a non-wartorn population in a developed country may be 1% compared to 1.5% to 3% of adults. On average, 16% of children exposed to a traumatic event develop PTSD, with the incidence varying according to the type of exposure and gender. Similar to the adult population, risk factors for PTSD in children include: female gender, exposure to disasters, maladaptive coping behaviors, or lacking proper social support systems.

Predictor models have consistently found that childhood trauma, chronic adversity, neurobiological differences, and familial stressors are associated with risk for PTSD after a traumatic event in adulthood. It has been difficult to find consistently predictive aspects of the events that predict, but peritraumatic dissociation has been a fairly consistent predictive indicator of the development of PTSD. Proximity to, duration of, and severity of the trauma make an impact. It has been speculated that interpersonal traumas cause more problems than impersonal ones, but this is controversial. The risk of developing PTSD is increased in individuals who are exposed to physical abuse, physical assault, or kidnapping. Women who experience physical violence are more likely to develop PTSD than men.

==== Intimate partner and sexual violence ====
An individual that has been exposed to domestic violence is predisposed to the development of PTSD. There is a strong association between the development of PTSD in mothers who experienced domestic violence during the perinatal period of their pregnancy.

Those who have experienced sexual assault or rape may develop symptoms of PTSD. The likelihood of sustained symptoms of PTSD is higher if the rapist confined or restrained the person, if the person being raped believed the rapist would kill them, the person who was raped was very young or very old, and if the rapist was someone they knew. The likelihood of sustained severe symptoms is also higher if people around the survivor ignore (or are ignorant of) the rape or blame the rape survivor.

==== War-related trauma, refugees ====
Service members are exposed to traumatic events during war. After deployment, to a combat zone, exposure to life-threatening situations is common. Other common events could be injury or death, been in a serious accident or handled human remains.

Military service in combat is a risk factor for developing PTSD. Around 22% of people exposed to combat develop PTSD; in about 25% of military personnel who develop PTSD, its appearance is delayed.

Refugees are also at an increased risk for PTSD due to their exposure to war, hardships, and traumatic events. The rates for PTSD within refugee populations range from 4% to 86%. While the stresses of war affect everyone involved, displaced persons are more so than others.

Challenges related to the overall psychosocial well-being of refugees are complex and individually nuanced. Refugees have reduced levels of well-being and a high rate of mental distress due to past and ongoing trauma. Groups that are particularly affected and whose needs often remain unmet are women, older people, and unaccompanied minors. Post-traumatic stress and depression in refugee populations also tend to affect their educational success.

==== Unexpected death of a loved one ====
Sudden, unexpected death of a loved one is the most common traumatic event type reported in cross-national studies. However, the majority of people who experience this type of event will not develop PTSD. An analysis from the WHO World Mental Health Surveys found a 5.2% risk of developing PTSD after learning of the unexpected death of a loved one. Because of the high prevalence of this type of traumatic event, the unexpected death of a loved one accounts for approximately 20% of PTSD cases worldwide.

==== Life-threatening or severe illness ====
Medical conditions associated with an increased risk of PTSD include cancer, heart attack, and stroke. 22% of cancer survivors present with lifelong PTSD like symptoms. Intensive-care unit (ICU) hospitalization is also a risk factor for PTSD. Some women experience PTSD from their experiences related to breast cancer and mastectomy. Loved ones of those who experience life-threatening illnesses are also at risk for developing PTSD, such as parents of a child with chronic illnesses.

==== Psychosis spectrum conditions ====
Research exists that demonstrates that survivors of psychotic episodes, which exist in diseases such as schizophrenia, schizoaffective disorder, bipolar I disorder, and others, are at greater risk of developing PTSD. This is often due to the experiences one may have during and after psychosis. Such traumatic experiences include, but are not limited to, experiences in psychiatric hospitals, police interactions, social stigma, and embarrassment due to psychotic behavior, suicidal behavior and attempts, distressing delusions and hallucinations, and the fear of losing control or actual loss of control. The incidence of PTSD in survivors of psychosis may be as low as 11% and as high at 67%.

==== Cancer ====
Prevalence estimates of cancer‐related PTSD range between 7% and 14%, with an additional 10% to 20% of patients experiencing subsyndromal post-traumatic stress symptoms (PTSS). Both PTSD and PTSS have been associated with increased distress and impaired quality of life, and have been reported in newly diagnosed patients as well as in long‐term survivors.

The PTSD Field Trials for the Diagnostic and Statistical Manual, Fourth Edition (DSM-IV), revealed that 22% of cancer survivors present with lifetime cancer-related PTSD (CR-PTSD), endorsing cancer diagnosis and treatment as a traumatic stressor.

Therefore, as the number of people diagnosed with cancer increases and cancer survivorship improves, cancer-related PTSD becomes a more prominent issue, so providing for cancer patients' physical and psychological needs becomes increasingly important.

==== Pregnancy-related trauma ====
Women who experience miscarriage are at risk of PTSD. Those who experience subsequent miscarriages have an increased risk of PTSD compared to those experiencing only one. PTSD can also occur after childbirth and the risk increases if a woman has experienced trauma before the pregnancy. Prevalence of PTSD following normal childbirth (that is, excluding stillbirth or major complications) is estimated to be between 2.8 and 5.6% at six weeks postpartum, with rates dropping to 1.5% at six months postpartum. Symptoms of PTSD are common following childbirth, with prevalence of 24–30.1% at six weeks, dropping to 13.6% at six months. Emergency childbirth is also associated with PTSD.

==== Natural disasters ====
People who experience natural disasters such as floods, earthquakes, tsunamis, hurricanes, and fires can develop post-traumatic stress disorder. A literature review of studies examining PTSD following disasters between 1980 and 2007 found that the prevalence of PTSD after natural disasters was lower than the prevalence of the condition after man-made disasters. This review found prevalence rates between 3.7% to 60%. Research has shown that PTSD impacts approximately one in four earthquake survivors (23.66%). Determinants of the risk of PTSD developing after disaster include the extent of physical injury, risk of life, and number of fatalities. Geographical proximity to the epicenter of a natural disaster has been shown to contribute to people developing PTSD. Natural disasters can displace families and challenge people's sense of control and security. Mental health recovery of individuals, communities and countries after emergencies, including natural disasters, is important for social and economic reasons. Mental health emergency preparedness and response need to be effective after natural disasters.

=== Genetics ===
There is evidence that susceptibility to PTSD is hereditary. Approximately 30% of the variance in PTSD is caused by genetics alone. For twin pairs exposed to combat in Vietnam, having a monozygotic (identical) twin with PTSD was associated with an increased risk of the co-twin's having PTSD compared to dizygotic twins (non-identical twins). Women with a smaller hippocampus might be more likely to develop PTSD following a traumatic event based on preliminary findings. Research has also found that PTSD shares many genetic influences common to other psychiatric disorders. Panic and generalized anxiety disorders, and PTSD share 60% of the same genetic variance. Alcohol, nicotine, and drug dependence share greater than 40% genetic similarities. Neuroscientist Dr. Rachel Yehuda researched how psychological trauma can travel across generations, specifically focusing on trans-generational trauma with Holocaust survivors and their offspring. The researchers in her study focused on a stress gene called FKBP5 that is linked to PTSD. The results of this study underscore the genetic components of PTSD as they showed an effect on methylation of the FKBP5 gene both in the parents who experienced trauma in concentration camps, as well as their offspring.

=== Evolutionary perspectives ===
Evolutionary psychiatry and Evolutionary psychology perspectives interpret PTSD symptoms as extreme or dysregulated forms of defensive responses that were advantageous in ancestral contexts. Hypervigilance, intrusive memories, and exaggerated startle responses may reflect overactivation of mechanisms designed to promote survival after trauma. While these accounts can help contextualize symptom clusters, reviews emphasize that they remain theoretical and require integration with neurobiological and psychosocial research.

== Pathophysiology ==
=== Neuroendocrinology ===
PTSD symptoms may result when a traumatic event causes an overreactive adrenaline response, which creates deep neurological patterns in the brain. These patterns can persist long after the event that triggered the fear, making an individual hyper-responsive to future fearful situations. During traumatic experiences, the high levels of stress hormones secreted suppress hypothalamic activity that may be a major factor toward the development of PTSD.

PTSD causes biochemical changes in the brain and body that differ from other psychiatric disorders, such as major depression. Individuals diagnosed with PTSD respond more strongly to a dexamethasone suppression test than individuals diagnosed with clinical depression.

Most people with PTSD show a low secretion of cortisol and high secretion of catecholamines in urine, with a norepinephrine/cortisol ratio consequently higher than comparable non-diagnosed individuals. This is in contrast to the normative fight-or-flight response, in which both catecholamine and cortisol levels are elevated after exposure to a stressor.

Brain catecholamine levels are high, and corticotropin-releasing factor (CRF) concentrations are high. Together, these findings suggest abnormality in the hypothalamic-pituitary-adrenal (HPA) axis.

The maintenance of fear has been shown to include the HPA axis, the locus coeruleus-noradrenergic systems, and the connections between the limbic system and frontal cortex. The HPA axis that coordinates the hormonal response to stress, which activates the LC-noradrenergic system, is implicated in the over-consolidation of memories that occurs in the aftermath of trauma. This over-consolidation increases the likelihood of one's developing PTSD. The amygdala is responsible for threat detection and the conditioned and unconditioned fear responses that are carried out as a response to a threat.

The HPA axis is responsible for coordinating the hormonal response to stress. Given the strong cortisol suppression to dexamethasone in PTSD, HPA axis abnormalities are likely predicated on strong negative feedback inhibition of cortisol, itself due to an increased sensitivity of glucocorticoid receptors.

PTSD has been hypothesized to be a maladaptive learning pathway to fear response through a hypersensitive, hyperreactive, and hyperresponsive HPA axis.

Low cortisol levels may predispose individuals to PTSD: Following war trauma, Swedish soldiers serving in Bosnia and Herzegovina with low pre-service salivary cortisol levels had a higher risk of reacting with PTSD symptoms, following war trauma, than soldiers with normal pre-service levels. Because cortisol is normally important in restoring homeostasis after the stress response, it is thought that trauma survivors with low cortisol experience a poorly contained—that is, longer and more distressing—response, setting the stage for PTSD.

It is thought that the locus coeruleus-noradrenergic system mediates the over-consolidation of fear memory. High levels of cortisol reduce noradrenergic activity, and because people with PTSD tend to have reduced levels of cortisol, it has been proposed that individuals with PTSD cannot regulate the increased noradrenergic response to traumatic stress. Intrusive memories and conditioned fear responses are thought to be a result of the response to associated triggers. Neuropeptide Y (NPY) has been reported to reduce the release of norepinephrine and has been demonstrated to have anxiolytic properties in animal models. Studies have shown that people with PTSD demonstrate reduced levels of NPY, possibly indicating their increased anxiety levels.

Other studies indicate that people with PTSD have chronically low levels of serotonin, which contributes to the commonly associated behavioral symptoms such as anxiety, ruminations, irritability, aggression, suicidality, and impulsivity. Serotonin also contributes to the stabilization of glucocorticoid production.

Dopamine levels in a person with PTSD can contribute to symptoms: low levels can contribute to anhedonia, apathy, impaired attention, and motor deficits; high levels can contribute to psychosis, agitation, and restlessness.

Studies have also described elevated concentrations of the thyroid hormone triiodothyronine in PTSD. This kind of type 2 allostatic adaptation may contribute to increased sensitivity to catecholamines and other stress mediators.

Hyperresponsiveness in the norepinephrine system can also be caused by continued exposure to high stress. Overactivation of adrenergic receptors in the prefrontal cortex can be connected to the flashbacks and nightmares frequently experienced by those with PTSD. A decrease in other norepinephrine functions (awareness of the current environment) prevents the memory mechanisms in the brain from processing the experience, and emotions the person is experiencing during a flashback are not associated with the current environment.

There is considerable controversy within the medical community regarding the neurobiology of PTSD. A 2012 review showed no clear relationship between cortisol levels and PTSD. The majority of reports indicate people with PTSD have elevated levels of CRF, lower basal cortisol levels, and enhanced negative feedback suppression of the HPA axis by dexamethasone.

=== Neuroimmunology ===
Studies on the peripheral immune have found dysfunction with elevated cytokine levels and a higher risk of immune-related chronic diseases among individuals with PTSD. Neuroimmune dysfunction has also been found in PTSD, raising the possibility of a suppressed central immune response due to reduced activity of microglia in the brain in response to immune challenges. Individuals with PTSD, compared to controls, have a lower increase in a marker of microglial activation (18-kDa translocator protein) following lipopolysaccharide administration. This neuroimmune suppression is also associated with greater severity of anhedonic symptoms. Researchers suggest that treatments aimed at restoring neuroimmune function could be beneficial for alleviating PTSD symptoms.

=== Neuroanatomy ===
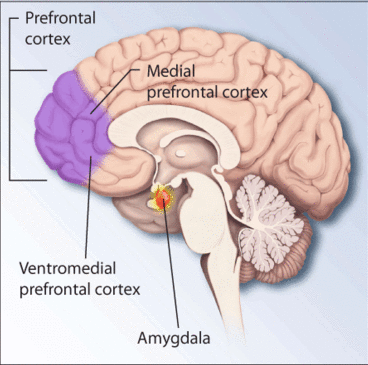
Regions of the brain associated with stress and post-traumatic stress disorder

A meta-analysis of structural MRI studies found an association with reduced total brain volume, intracranial volume, and volumes of the hippocampus, insula cortex, and anterior cingulate. Much of this research stems from PTSD in those exposed to the Vietnam War.

People with PTSD have decreased brain activity in the dorsal and rostral anterior cingulate cortices and the ventromedial prefrontal cortex, areas linked to the experience and regulation of emotion.

The amygdala is strongly involved in forming emotional memories, especially fear-related memories. During high stress, the hippocampus, which is associated with placing memories in the correct context of space and time and memory recall, is suppressed. According to one theory, this suppression may be the cause of the flashbacks that can affect people with PTSD. When someone with PTSD undergoes stimuli similar to the traumatic event, the body perceives the event as occurring again because the memory was never properly recorded in the person's memory.

The amygdalocentric model of PTSD proposes that the amygdala is very much aroused and insufficiently controlled by the medial prefrontal cortex and the hippocampus, in particular during extinction. This is consistent with an interpretation of PTSD as a syndrome of deficient extinction ability.

The basolateral nucleus (BLA) of the amygdala is responsible for the comparison and development of associations between unconditioned and conditioned responses to stimuli, which results in the fear conditioning present in PTSD. The BLA activates the central nucleus (CeA) of the amygdala, which elaborates the fear response (including behavioral response to threat and elevated startle response). Descending inhibitory inputs from the medial prefrontal cortex (mPFC) regulate the transmission from the BLA to the CeA, which is hypothesized to play a role in the extinction of conditioned fear responses.

While as a whole, amygdala hyperactivity is reported by meta-analysis of functional neuroimaging in PTSD, there is a large degree of heterogeneity, more so than in social anxiety disorder or phobic disorder. Comparing dorsal (roughly the CeA) and ventral (roughly the BLA) clusters, hyperactivity is more robust in the ventral cluster, while hypoactivity is evident in the dorsal cluster. The distinction may explain the blunted emotions in PTSD (via desensitization in the CeA) as well as the fear-related component.

In a 2007 study, Vietnam War combat veterans with PTSD showed a 20% reduction in the volume of their hippocampus compared with veterans who did not have such symptoms. This finding was not replicated in chronic PTSD patients traumatized at an air show plane crash in 1988 (Ramstein, Germany).

Evidence suggests that endogenous cannabinoid levels are reduced in PTSD, particularly anandamide, and that cannabinoid receptors (CB1) are increased to compensate. There appears to be a link between increased CB1 receptor availability in the amygdala and abnormal threat processing and hyperarousal, but not dysphoria, in trauma survivors.

A 2020 study found no evidence for conclusions from prior research that suggested low IQ is a risk factor for developing PTSD.

== Diagnosis ==
NICE recommends clinicians familiarise themselves with the range of symptoms associated with functional impairment and events that are known to contribute to the development of PTSD. It is advised to ask specific questions when assessing and to consider the frequency of traumatic events experienced. Assessment should be comprehensive, including an assessment of physical, psychological, and social needs and a risk assessment.

PTSD can be difficult to diagnose because of:

- the subjective nature of most of the diagnostic criteria (although this is true for many mental disorders);
- the potential for over-reporting, e.g., while seeking disability benefits, or when PTSD could be a mitigating factor at criminal sentencing
- the potential for under-reporting, e.g., stigma, pride, fear that a PTSD diagnosis might preclude certain employment opportunities;
- symptom overlap with other mental disorders such as obsessive compulsive disorder and generalized anxiety disorder;
- association with other mental disorders such as major depressive disorder and generalized anxiety disorder;
- substance use disorders, which often produce some of the same signs and symptoms as PTSD; and
- substance use disorders can increase vulnerability to PTSD or exacerbate PTSD symptoms or both; and
- PTSD increases the risk of developing substance use disorders.
- the differential expression of symptoms culturally (specifically with respect to avoidance and numbing symptoms, distressing dreams, and somatic symptoms)

=== Screening ===
There are a number of PTSD screening instruments for adults, such as the PTSD Checklist for DSM-5 (PCL-5) and the Primary Care PTSD Screen for DSM-5 (PC-PTSD-5). The 17 item PTSD checklist is also capable of monitoring the severity of symptoms and the response to treatment.

There are also several screening and assessment instruments for use with children and adolescents. These include the Child PTSD Symptom Scale (CPSS), Child Trauma Screening Questionnaire, and UCLA Post-traumatic Stress Disorder Reaction Index for DSM-IV.

In addition, there are also screening and assessment instruments for caregivers of very young children (six years of age and younger). These include the Young Child PTSD Screen, the Young Child PTSD Checklist, and the Diagnostic Infant and Preschool Assessment.

=== Assessment ===
Evidence-based assessment principles, including a multimethod assessment approach, form the foundation of PTSD assessment. Those who conduct assessments for PTSD may use various clinician-administered interviews and instruments to provide an official PTSD diagnosis. Some commonly used, reliable, and valid assessment instruments for PTSD diagnosis, in accordance with the DSM-5, include the Clinician-Administered PTSD Scale for the DSM-5 (CAPS-5), PTSD Symptom Scale Interview (PSS-I-5), and Structured Clinical Interview for DSM-5 – PTSD Module (SCID-5 PTSD Module).

=== In the DSM and ICD ===
PTSD was classified as an anxiety disorder in the DSM-IV, but has since been reclassified as a "trauma- and stressor-related disorder" in the DSM-5. The DSM-5 diagnostic criteria for PTSD include four symptom clusters: re-experiencing, avoidance, negative alterations in cognition/mood, and alterations in arousal and reactivity.

The International Classification of Diseases and Related Health Problems, 10th Revision (ICD-10) classifies PTSD (code F43.1) under "Reaction to severe stress, and adjustment disorders". The ICD-10 criteria for PTSD include re-experiencing, avoidance, and either increased reactivity or inability to recall certain details related to the event.

The ICD-11 diagnostic description for PTSD (code 6B40) contains three components or symptom groups (1) re-experiencing, (2) avoidance, and (3) heightened sense of threat. ICD-11 no longer includes verbal thoughts about the traumatic event as a symptom. There is a predicted lower rate of diagnosed PTSD using ICD-11 compared to ICD-10 or DSM-5. ICD-11 also proposes identifying a distinct subgroup with complex post-traumatic stress disorder (C-PTSD; code 6B41), who have more often experienced several or sustained traumas and have greater functional impairment than those with PTSD.

=== Differential diagnosis ===
A diagnosis of PTSD requires that the person has been exposed to an extreme stressor. Any stressor can result in a diagnosis of adjustment disorder, and it is an appropriate diagnosis for a stressor and a symptom pattern that does not meet the criteria for PTSD.

The symptom pattern for acute stress disorder must occur and be resolved within four weeks of the trauma. If it lasts longer, and the symptom pattern fits the characteristics of PTSD, the diagnosis may be changed.

Obsessive–compulsive disorder (OCD) may be diagnosed for intrusive thoughts that are recurring but not related to a specific traumatic event.

In extreme cases of prolonged, repeated traumatization where there is no viable chance of escape, survivors may develop complex post-traumatic stress disorder. This occurs as a result of layers of trauma rather than a single traumatic event, and includes additional symptomatology, such as the loss of a coherent sense of self.

== Prevention ==
Modest benefits have been seen from early access to cognitive behavioral therapy. Critical incident stress management has been suggested as a means of preventing PTSD, but subsequent studies suggest it may produce negative outcomes. A 2019 Cochrane review did not find evidence to support the use of intervention and that "multiple session interventions may result in worse outcomes than no intervention, for some individuals." The World Health Organization recommends against the use of benzodiazepines and antidepressants for acute stress (symptoms lasting less than one month). Some evidence supports the use of hydrocortisone for prevention in adults, although there is limited or no evidence supporting propranolol, escitalopram, temazepam, or gabapentin.

=== Psychological debriefing ===
Trauma-exposed individuals often receive treatment called psychological debriefing in an effort to prevent PTSD, which consists of interviews that are meant to allow individuals to directly confront the event and share their feelings with the counselor and to help structure their memories of the event. However, several meta-analyses found that psychological debriefing is unhelpful, is potentially harmful and does not reduce the future risk of developing PTSD. This is true for both single-session debriefing and multiple session interventions. As of 2017 the American Psychological Association assessed psychological debriefing as No Research Support/Treatment is Potentially Harmful.

=== Early intervention ===
Trauma-focused intervention delivered within days or weeks of the potentially traumatic event has been found to decrease PTSD symptoms. Similar to psychological debriefing, the goal of early intervention is to lessen the intensity and frequency of stress symptoms, to prevent new-onset or relapsed mental disorders and further distress later in the healing process.

=== Risk-targeted interventions ===
Risk-targeted interventions are those that attempt to mitigate specific formative information or events. It can target modeling normal behaviors, instruction on a task, or giving information on the event.

== Management ==
=== Combination therapy ===
Most combination therapy (psychological and pharmacotherapy) does not seem to be more effective than psychological therapy alone, except for possibly MDMA-assisted psychotherapy. Fourteen systematic reviews of up to 353 participants suggest MDMA-assisted psychotherapy may substantially improve PTSD symptoms, response, and remission rates compared to psychotherapy alone, but the evidence is low to very low certainty and safety data are limited, with some increased transient adverse events.

Canada regulates limited distribution of MDMA upon application to and approval by Health Canada. In Australia, it may be prescribed in the treatment of PTSD by specifically authorized psychiatrists. Although once considering MDMA as a "breakthrough therapy", the FDA rejected it for treating PTSD in 2024, citing trial design and safety concerns.

According to some reviews, MDMA-assisted psychotherapy reduces PTSD symptoms compared with control therapies and demonstrates a generally tolerable safety profile; its applicability is tempered by small sample sizes and adverse effects. The possible therapeutic effects of MDMA may be overestimated due to participant unblinding and expectancy biases.

=== Counselling ===
The approaches with the strongest evidence include behavioral and cognitive-behavioral therapies such as prolonged exposure therapy, cognitive processing therapy (CPT), and eye movement desensitization and reprocessing (EMDR). There is some evidence for brief eclectic psychotherapy (BEP), narrative exposure therapy (NET), and written exposure therapy. Research suggests that mindfulness and mindfulness-based interventions (which emphasize attention to present-moment experience and reduced engagement with rumination), can be effective in addressing post-traumatic stress.

A 2019 Cochrane review evaluated couples and family therapies compared to no care and individual and group therapies for the treatment of PTSD. There were too few studies on couples therapies to determine if substantive benefits were derived, but preliminary RCTs suggested that couples therapies may be beneficial for reducing PTSD symptoms.

A meta-analytic comparison of EMDR and CBT found both protocols indistinguishable in terms of effectiveness in treating PTSD; however, "the contribution of the eye movement component in EMDR to treatment outcome" is unclear. A meta-analysis in children and adolescents also found that EMDR was as efficacious as CBT.

Children with PTSD are far more likely to pursue treatment at school (because of its proximity and ease) than at a free clinic.

==== Cognitive behavioral therapy ====
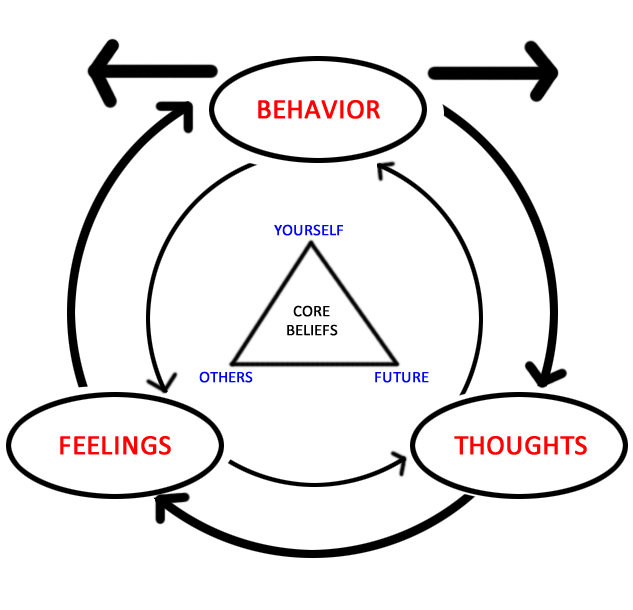
The diagram depicts how emotions, thoughts, and behaviors all influence each other. The triangle in the middle represents CBT's tenet that all humans' core beliefs can be summed up in three categories: self, others, and future.

CBT seeks to change the way a person feels and acts by changing the patterns of thinking or behavior, or both, responsible for negative emotions. Results from a 2018 systematic review found high strength of evidence that supports CBT-exposure therapy efficacious for a reduction in PTSD and depression symptoms, as well as the loss of PTSD diagnosis. CBT has been proven to be an effective treatment for PTSD and is currently considered the standard of care for PTSD by the United States Department of Defense.

In CBT, individuals learn to identify thoughts that make them feel afraid or upset and replace them with less distressing thoughts. The goal is to understand how certain thoughts about events cause PTSD-related stress. A study assessing an online version of CBT for people with mild-to-moderate PTSD found that the online approach was as effective as, and cheaper than, the same therapy given face-to-face. A 2021 Cochrane review assessed the provision of CBT in an Internet-based format found similar beneficial effects for Internet-based therapy as in face-to-face. However, the quality of the evidence was low due to the small number of trials reviewed.

Exposure therapy is a type of cognitive behavioral therapy that involves assisting trauma survivors to re-experience distressing trauma-related memories and reminders to facilitate habituation and successful emotional processing of the trauma memory. Most exposure therapy programs include both imaginal confrontation with the traumatic memories and real-life exposure to trauma reminders; this type of CBT has shown benefit in the treatment of PTSD.

Some organizations have endorsed the need for exposure. The U.S. Department of Veterans Affairs has been actively training mental health treatment staff in prolonged exposure therapy and cognitive processing therapy in an effort to better treat U.S. veterans with PTSD.

Recent research on contextually based third-generation behavior therapies suggests that they may produce results comparable to some of the better validated therapies. Many of these therapy methods have a significant element of exposure and have demonstrated success in treating the primary problems of PTSD and co-occurring depressive symptoms.

==== Eye movement desensitization and reprocessing ====
Eye movement desensitization and reprocessing (EMDR) is a form of psychotherapy developed and studied by Francine Shapiro. She had noticed that, when she was thinking about disturbing memories herself, her eyes were moving rapidly. When she brought her eye movements under control while thinking, the thoughts were less distressing.

In 2002, Shapiro and Maxfield published a theory of why this might work, called adaptive information processing. This theory proposes that eye movement can be used to facilitate emotional processing of memories, changing the person's memory to attend to more adaptive information. The therapist initiates voluntary rapid eye movements while the person focuses on memories, feelings or thoughts about a particular trauma. The therapist uses hand movements to get the person to move their eyes backward and forward, but hand-tapping or tones can also be used. EMDR closely resembles cognitive behavior therapy as it combines exposure (re-visiting the traumatic event), working on cognitive processes and relaxation/self-monitoring. However, exposure by way of being asked to think about the experience rather than talk about it has been highlighted as one of the more important distinguishing elements of EMDR.

Several scientific studies have evaluated the efficacy of EMDR in adults as well as children and adolescents. There is moderate strength of evidence to support the efficacy of EMDR "for reduction in PTSD symptoms, loss of diagnosis, and reduction in depressive symptoms" according to a 2018 systematic review update.

In children and adolescents, a recent meta-analysis of randomized controlled trials found that EMDR was at least as efficacious as CBT, and superior to waitlist or placebo. There was some evidence that EMDR might prevent depression. Adverse effects were largely unstudied. The benefits were greater for women with a history of sexual assault compared with people who had experienced other types of traumatizing events (such as accidents, physical assaults, and war).

The eye movement component of the therapy may not be critical for benefit.

==== Interpersonal psychotherapy ====
Other approaches, in particular involving social supports, may also be important. An open trial of interpersonal psychotherapy reported high rates of remission from PTSD symptoms without using exposure.

=== Medication ===
Four antidepressants (sertraline, fluoxetine, paroxetine, and venlafaxine) have been shown to have a small to modest benefit over placebo.

==== Antidepressants ====
Selective serotonin reuptake inhibitors (SSRIs) and serotonin–norepinephrine reuptake inhibitors (SNRIs) may have some benefit for PTSD symptoms. Tricyclic antidepressants are equally effective, but are less well tolerated. Evidence provides support for a small or modest improvement with sertraline, fluoxetine, paroxetine, and venlafaxine. Thus, these four medications are considered to be first-line medications for PTSD. The SSRIs paroxetine and sertraline are approved by the U.S. Food and Drug Administration (FDA) for the treatment of PTSD.

==== Benzodiazepines ====
Benzodiazepines are a point of contention for the treatment of PTSD due to some evidence showing a risk of worsening PTSD symptoms. Some authors believe that the use of benzodiazepines is contraindicated for acute stress, as this group of drugs can cause dissociation. Nevertheless, some use benzodiazepines with caution for short-term anxiety and insomnia. While benzodiazepines can alleviate acute anxiety, there is no consistent evidence that they can stop the development of PTSD and may actually increase the risk of developing PTSD 2–5 times. Some say that benzodiazepines should not be used in the immediate aftermath of a traumatic event as they may increase symptoms related to PTSD.

Benzodiazepines may reduce the effectiveness of psychotherapeutic interventions, and there is some evidence that benzodiazepines may actually contribute to the development and chronicity of PTSD. For those who already have PTSD, benzodiazepines may worsen and prolong the course of illness, by worsening psychotherapy outcomes, and causing or exacerbating aggression, depression (including suicidality), and substance use. Drawbacks include the risk of developing a benzodiazepine dependence, tolerance (i.e., short-term benefits wearing off with time), and withdrawal syndrome; additionally, individuals with PTSD (even those without a history of alcohol or drug misuse) are at an increased risk of abusing benzodiazepines.

Due to several other treatments with greater efficacy for PTSD and fewer risks, benzodiazepines should be considered relatively contraindicated until all other treatment options are exhausted.

Benzodiazepines also carry a risk of disinhibition (associated with suicidality) and some evidence suggests their use may delay or inhibit more definitive treatments for PTSD.

Some evidence suggests that the hazards of benzodiazepines for PTSD are less than originally thought, since when antidepressants are accounted for the hazard ratio goes down significantly.

==== Prazosin ====
Prazosin, an alpha-1 adrenergic antagonist, has been used in veterans with PTSD to reduce nightmares. Studies show variability in symptom improvement, appropriate dosages, and efficacy in this population.

==== Glucocorticoids ====
Glucocorticoids may be useful for short-term therapy to protect against neurodegeneration caused by the extended stress response that characterizes PTSD, but long-term use may actually promote neurodegeneration.

==== Cannabinoids ====
Cannabis is not recommended as a treatment for PTSD because scientific evidence does not currently exist demonstrating treatment efficacy for cannabinoids. (Note: As an example of such research, see: Bonn-Miller MO, Sisley S, Riggs P, Yazar-Klosinski B, Wang JB, Loflin MJ, et al. (17 March 2021). "The short-term impact of 3 smoked cannabis preparations versus placebo on PTSD symptoms: A randomized cross-over clinical trial". PLOS ONE. 16 (3) e0246990. Bibcode:2021PLoSO..1646990B. doi:10.1371/journal.pone.0246990. PMC 7968689. PMID 33730032.) However, use of cannabis or derived products is widespread among U.S. veterans with PTSD.

The cannabinoid nabilone is sometimes used for nightmares in PTSD. Although some short-term benefit was shown, adverse effects are common, and it has not been adequately studied to determine efficacy. An increasing number of states permit and have legalized the use of medical cannabis for the treatment of PTSD.

=== Other ===
==== Exercise, sport and physical activity ====
Physical activity can influence people's psychological and physical health. The U.S. National Center for PTSD recommends moderate exercise as a way to distract from disturbing emotions, build self-esteem and increase feelings of being in control again. They recommend a discussion with a doctor before starting an exercise program.

==== Play therapy for children ====
Play is thought to help children link their inner thoughts with their outer world, connecting real experiences with abstract thought. Repetitive play can also be one way a child relives traumatic events, and that can be a symptom of trauma in a child or young person. Although it is commonly used, there have not been enough studies comparing outcomes in groups of children receiving and not receiving play therapy, so the effects of play therapy are not yet understood.

==== Military programs ====
Many veterans of the wars in Iraq and Afghanistan have faced significant physical, emotional, and relational disruptions. In response, the United States Marine Corps has instituted programs to assist them in re-adjusting to civilian life, especially in their relationships with spouses and loved ones, to help them communicate better and understand what the other has gone through. Walter Reed Army Institute of Research (WRAIR) developed the Battlemind program to assist service members avoid or ameliorate PTSD and related problems. Wounded Warrior Project partnered with the US Department of Veterans Affairs to create Warrior Care Network, a national health system of PTSD treatment centers.

==== Nightmares ====
In 2020, the United States Food and Drug Administration granted marketing approval for an Apple Watch app called NightWare. The app aims to improve sleep for people suffering from PTSD-related nightmares by vibrating when it detects a nightmare in progress based on monitoring heart rate and body movement.

== Epidemiology ==
Disability-adjusted life year rates for post-traumatic stress disorder per 100,000 inhabitants in 2004 no data < 43.5 43.5–45 45–46.5 46.5–48 48–49.5 49.5–51 51–52.5 52.5–54 54–55.5 55.5–57 57–58.5 > 58.5

There is debate over the rates of PTSD found in populations, but, despite changes in diagnosis and the criteria used to define PTSD between 1997 and 2013, epidemiological rates have not changed significantly. Most of the current reliable data regarding the epidemiology of PTSD is based on DSM-IV criteria, as the DSM-5 was not introduced until 2013.

The United Nations' World Health Organization publishes estimates of PTSD impact for each of its member states; the latest data available are for 2004. Considering only the 25 most populated countries ranked by overall age-standardized Disability-Adjusted Life Year (DALY) rate, the top half of the ranked list is dominated by Asian/Pacific countries, the US, and Egypt. Ranking the countries by the male-only or female-only rates produces much the same result, but with less meaningfulness, as the score range in the single-sex rankings is much-reduced (4 for women, 3 for men, as compared with 14 for the overall score range), suggesting that the differences between female and male rates, within each country, is what drives the distinctions between the countries.

As of 2017, the cross-national lifetime prevalence of PTSD was 3.9%, based on a survey where 5.6% had been exposed to trauma. The primary factor impacting treatment-seeking behavior, which can help to mitigate PTSD development after trauma was income, while being younger, female, and having less social status (less education, lower individual income, and being unemployed) were all factors associated with less treatment-seeking behavior.

Age-standardized Disability-adjusted life year (DALY) rates for PTSD, per 100,000 inhabitants, in 25 most populous countries, ranked by overall rate (2004)
Region	Country	PTSD DALY rate, overall	PTSD DALY rate, females	PTSD DALY rate, males
Asia / Pacific	Thailand	59	86	30
Asia / Pacific	Indonesia	58	86	30
Asia / Pacific	Philippines	58	86	30
Americas	USA	58	86	30
Asia / Pacific	Bangladesh	57	85	29
Africa	Egypt	56	83	30
Asia / Pacific	India	56	85	29
Asia / Pacific	Iran	56	83	30
Asia / Pacific	Pakistan	56	85	29
Asia / Pacific	Japan	55	80	31
Asia / Pacific	Myanmar	55	81	30
Europe	Turkey	55	81	30
Asia / Pacific	Vietnam	55	80	30
Europe	France	54	80	28
Europe	Germany	54	80	28
Europe	Italy	54	80	28
Asia / Pacific	Russian Federation	54	78	30
Europe	United Kingdom	54	80	28
Africa	Nigeria	53	76	29
Africa	Dem. Republ. of Congo	52	76	28
Africa	Ethiopia	52	76	28
Africa	South Africa	52	76	28
Asia / Pacific	China	51	76	28
Americas	Mexico	46	60	30
Americas	Brazil	45	60	30

=== United States ===
PTSD affects about 5% of the US adult population each year. The National Comorbidity Survey Replication has estimated that the lifetime prevalence of PTSD among adult Americans is 6.8%, with women (9.7%) more than twice as likely as men (3.6%) to have PTSD at some point in their lives. More than 60% of men and more than 60% of women experience at least one traumatic event in their life. The most frequently reported traumatic events by men are rape, combat, and childhood neglect or physical abuse. Women most frequently report instances of rape, sexual molestation, physical attack, being threatened with a weapon, and childhood physical abuse. 88% of men and 79% of women with lifetime PTSD have at least one comorbid psychiatric disorder. Major depressive disorder, 48% of men and 49% of women, and lifetime alcohol use disorder or dependence, 51.9% of men and 27.9% of women, are the most common comorbid disorders.

==== Military combat ====
The United States Department of Veterans Affairs estimates that 830,000 Vietnam War veterans had symptoms of PTSD. The National Vietnam Veterans' Readjustment Study (NVVRS) found 15% of male and 9% of female Vietnam veterans had PTSD at the time of the study. The lifetime prevalence of PTSD was 31% for males and 27% for females. In a reanalysis of the NVVRS data, along with analysis of the data from the Matsunaga Vietnam Veterans Project, Schnurr, Lunney, Sengupta, and Waelde found that, contrary to the initial analysis of the NVVRS data, a large majority of Vietnam veterans had PTSD symptoms (but not the disorder itself). Four out of five reported recent symptoms when interviewed 20–25 years after Vietnam.

A 2011 study from Georgia State University and San Diego State University found that rates of PTSD diagnosis increased significantly when troops were stationed in combat zones, had tours of longer than a year, experienced combat, or were injured. Military personnel serving in combat zones were 12.1 percentage points more likely to receive a PTSD diagnosis than their active-duty counterparts in non-combat zones. Those serving more than 12 months in a combat zone were 14.3 percentage points more likely to be diagnosed with PTSD than those who had served less than one year.

Experiencing an enemy firefight was associated with an 18.3 percentage point increase in the probability of PTSD, while being wounded or injured in combat was associated with a 23.9 percentage point increase in the likelihood of a PTSD diagnosis. For the 2.16 million U.S. troops deployed in combat zones between 2001 and 2010, the total estimated two-year costs of treatment for combat-related PTSD are between $1.54 billion and $2.69 billion.

As of 2013, rates of PTSD have been estimated at up to 20% for veterans returning from Iraq and Afghanistan. As of 2013 13% of veterans returning from Iraq were unemployed.

==== Human-made disasters ====
The September 11 attacks in the United States took the lives of nearly 3,000 people, leaving 6,000 injured. First responders (police, firefighters, and emergency medical technicians), sanitation workers, and volunteers were all involved in the recovery efforts. The prevalence of probable PTSD in these highly exposed populations was estimated across several studies using in-person, telephone, and online interviews and questionnaires. Overall prevalence of PTSD was highest immediately following the attacks and decreased over time. However, disparities were found among the different types of recovery workers. The rate of probable PTSD for first responders was lowest directly after the attacks and increased from ranges of 4.8–7.8% to 7.4–16.5% between the 5–6 year follow-up and a later assessment.

When comparing traditional responders to non-traditional responders (volunteers), the probable PTSD prevalence 2.5 years after the initial visit was greater in volunteers, with estimates of 11.7% and 17.2% respectively. Volunteer participation in tasks atypical to the defined occupational role was a significant risk factor for PTSD. Other risk factors included exposure intensity, earlier start date, duration of time spent on site, and constant, negative reminders of the trauma.

Additional research has been performed to understand the social consequences of the September 11 attacks. Alcohol consumption was assessed in a cohort of World Trade Center workers using the cut-annoyed-guilty-eye (CAGE) questionnaire for alcohol use disorder. Almost 50% of World Trade Center workers who self-identified as alcohol users reported drinking more during the rescue efforts. Nearly a quarter of these individuals reported drinking more following the recovery. If determined to have probable PTSD status, the risk of developing an alcohol problem was double compared to those without psychological morbidity. Social disability was also studied in this cohort as a social consequence of the September 11 attacks. Defined by the disruption of family, work, and social life, the risk of developing social disability increased 17-fold when categorized as having probable PTSD.

== Anthropology ==
Cultural and medical anthropologists have questioned the validity of applying the diagnostic criteria of PTSD cross-culturally.

Trauma (and resulting PTSD) is often experienced through the outermost limits of suffering, pain, and fear. The images and experiences relived through PTSD often defy easy description through language. Therefore, the translation of these experiences from one language to another is problematic, and the primarily Euro-American research on trauma is necessarily limited.

For example, ethnopsychology studies in Nepal have found that cultural idioms and concepts related to trauma often do not translate to western terminologies: piDaa is a term that may align to trauma/suffering, but also people who suffer from piDaa are considered paagal (mad) and are subject to negative social stigma, indicating the need for culturally appropriate and carefully tailored support interventions. More generally, different cultures remember traumatic experiences within different linguistic and cultural paradigms. As such, cultural and medical anthropologists have questioned the validity of applying the diagnostic criteria of PTSD cross-culturally, as defined in the Diagnostic and Statistical Manual of Mental Disorders (DSM-5), and constructed through the Euro-American paradigm of psychology.

There remains a dearth of studies into the conceptual frameworks that surround trauma in non-Western cultures. There is little evidence to suggest therapeutic benefit in synthesizing local idioms of distress into a culturally constructed disorder of the post-Vietnam era, a practice anthropologist believe contributes to category fallacy. For many cultures, there is no single linguistic corollary to PTSD, psychological trauma being a multi-faceted concept with corresponding variances of expression.

Designating the effects of trauma as an affliction of the spirit is common in many non-Western cultures, where idioms such as "soul loss" and "weak heart" indicate a preference to confer suffering to a spirit-body or heart-body diametric. These idioms reflect the emphasis that collectivist cultures place on healing trauma through familial, cultural, and religious activities while avoiding the stigma that accompanies a mind-body approach. Prescribing PTSD diagnostics within these communities is ineffective and often detrimental. For trauma that extends beyond the individual, such as the effects of war, anthropologists believe applying the term "social suffering" or "cultural bereavement" to be more beneficial.

Every facet of society is affected by conflict; the prolonged exposure to mass violence can lead to a 'continuous suffering' among civilians, soldiers, and bordering countries. Entered into the DSM in 1980, clinicians and psychiatrists based the diagnostic criteria for PTSD around American veterans of the Vietnam War. Though the DSM gets reviewed and updated regularly, it is unable to fully encompass the disorder due to its Americanization (or Westernization). That is, what may be considered characteristics of PTSD in Western society may not directly translate across to other cultures around the world. Displaced people of the African country Burundi experienced symptoms of depression and anxiety, though a few symptoms specific to PTSD were noted.

In a similar review, Sudanese refugees relocated in Uganda were 'concerned with material [effects]' (lack of food, shelter, and healthcare), rather than psychological distress. In this case, many refugees did not present symptoms at all, with a minor few developing anxiety and depression. War-related stresses and traumas will be ingrained in the individual, however, they will be affected differently from culture to culture, and the "clear-cut" rubric for diagnosing PTSD does not allow for culturally contextual reactions to take place.

According to Arnaud Dephalese, PTSD are not only a major theme of American cinema but also a key theme for understanding American culture and civilization.

== Veterans ==
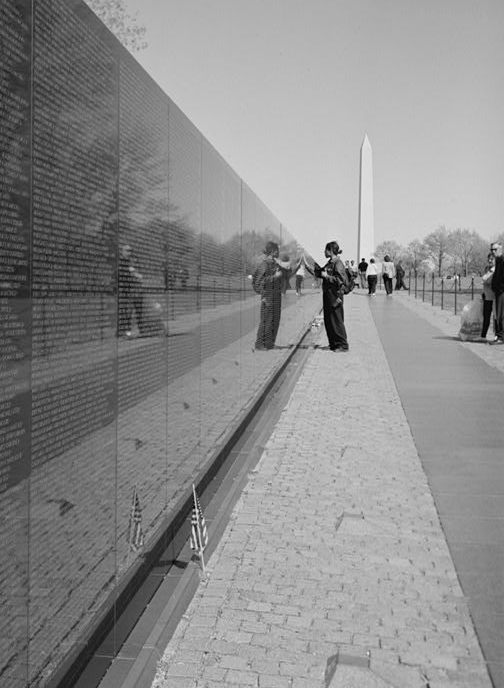
Vietnam Veterans Memorial, Washington, D.C.

=== United States ===
The United States provides a range of benefits for veterans that the VA has determined have PTSD that developed during, or as a result of, their military service. These benefits may include tax-free cash payments, free or low-cost mental health treatment and other healthcare, vocational rehabilitation services, employment assistance, and independent living support.

=== United Kingdom ===
In the UK, there are various charities and service organisations dedicated to aiding veterans in readjusting to civilian life. The Royal British Legion and the more recently established Help for Heroes are two of Britain's more high-profile veterans' organisations, which have actively advocated for veterans over the years. There has been some controversy that the NHS has not done enough in tackling mental health issues and is instead "dumping" veterans on charities such as Combat Stress.

=== Canada ===
Veterans Affairs Canada provides assistance to disabled veterans that includes rehabilitation, financial aid, job placement, healthcare, disability compensation, peer support, and family support.

== History ==
Aspects of PTSD in soldiers of ancient Assyria have been identified using written sources from 1300 to 600 BCE. These Assyrian soldiers would undergo a three-year rotation of combat before being allowed to return home, and were reported to have faced immense challenges in reconciling their past actions in war with their civilian lives.

Connections between the actions of Viking berserkers and the hyperarousal of post-traumatic stress disorder have also been drawn.

Psychiatrist Jonathan Shay has proposed that Lady Percy's soliloquy in the William Shakespeare play Henry IV, Part 1 (act 2, scene 3, lines 40–62), written around 1597, represents an unusually accurate description of the symptom constellation of PTSD.

Many historical wartime diagnoses such as railway spine, stress syndrome, nostalgia, soldier's heart, shell shock, battle fatigue, combat stress reaction, and traumatic war neurosis are now associated with PTSD. The American Civil War in 1861-1865 and the Franco-Prussian War in 1870-1871 marked the first formal attempts to medically address the problems of military combat-troops and later veterans having to experience extreme humane conditions during combat.

The correlations between combat and PTSD are undeniable; according to Stéphane Audoin-Rouzeau and Annette Becker, "One-tenth of mobilized American men were hospitalized for mental disturbances between 1942 and 1945, and, after thirty-five days of uninterrupted combat, 98% of them manifested psychiatric disturbances in varying degrees."

The DSM-I (1952) includes a diagnosis of "gross stress reaction", which has similarities to the modern definition and understanding of PTSD. Gross stress reaction is defined as a normal personality using established patterns of reaction to deal with overwhelming fear as a response to conditions of great stress. The diagnosis includes language which relates the condition to combat as well as to "civilian catastrophe".

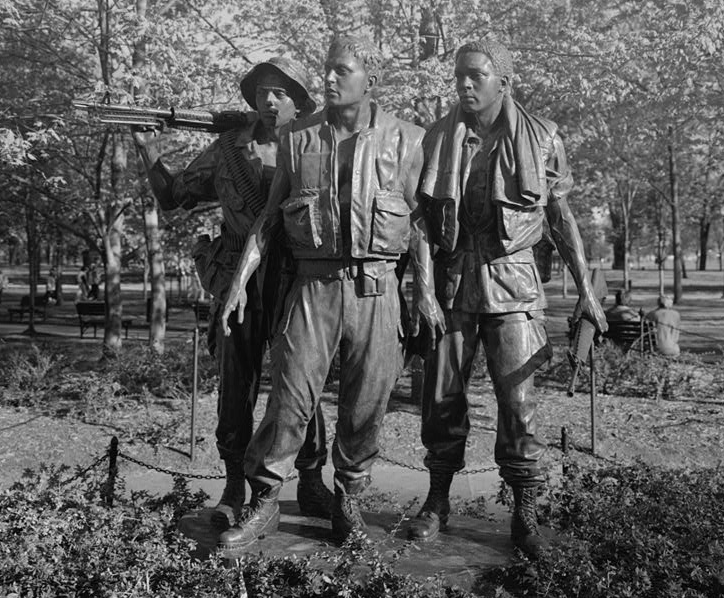
Statue, Three Servicemen, Vietnam Veterans Memorial

The addition of the term to the DSM-III was greatly influenced by the experiences and conditions of U.S. military veterans of the Vietnam War. In fact, much of the available published research regarding PTSD is based on studies done on veterans of the war in Vietnam.

Because of the initial overt focus on PTSD as a combat related disorder when it was first fleshed out in the years following the war in Vietnam, in 1975 Ann Wolbert Burgess and Lynda Lytle Holmstrom defined rape trauma syndrome (RTS) to draw attention to the striking similarities between the experiences of soldiers returning from war and of rape victims. This paved the way for a more comprehensive understanding of the causes of PTSD.

Early in 1978, the diagnosis term "post-traumatic stress disorder" was first recommended in a working group finding presented to the Committee of Reactive Disorders.

A USAF study carried out in 1979 focused on individuals (civilian and military) who had worked to recover or identify the remains of those who died in Jonestown. The bodies had been dead for several days, and a third of them had been children. The study used the term "dysphoria" to describe PTSD-like symptoms.

After PTSD became an official American psychiatric diagnosis with the publication of DSM-III (1980), the number of personal injury lawsuits (tort claims) asserting the plaintiff had PTSD increased rapidly. However, triers of fact (judges and juries) often regarded the PTSD diagnostic criteria as imprecise, a view shared by legal scholars, trauma specialists, forensic psychologists, and forensic psychiatrists. The condition was termed "posttraumatic stress disorder" in the DSM-III (1980).

In the 1980s, attention focused on the experiences of Vietnam War veterans. Organized research efforts and publications addressing the psychological effects of combat. Studies from this period included works such as The Trauma of War: Stress and Recovery in Viet Nam Veterans (1985), edited by Stephen Sonnenberg and Arthur Blank.

Professional discussions and debates in academic journals, at conferences, and between thought leaders, led to a more clearly defined set of diagnostic criteria in DSM-IV (1994), particularly the definition of a "traumatic event". The DSM-IV classified PTSD under anxiety disorders. In the ICD-10 (first used in 1994), the spelling of the condition was "post-traumatic stress disorder".

In 2012, the researchers from the Grady Trauma Project highlighted the tendency people have to focus on the combat side of PTSD: "less public awareness has focused on civilian PTSD, which results from trauma exposure that is not combat related..." and "much of the research on civilian PTSD has focused on the sequelae of a single, disastrous event, such as the Oklahoma City bombing, September 11th attacks, and Hurricane Katrina". Disparity in the focus of PTSD research affected the already popular perception of the exclusive interconnectedness of combat and PTSD. This is misleading when it comes to understanding the implications and extent of PTSD as a neurological disorder.

The DSM-5 (2013) created a new category called "trauma and stressor-related disorders", in which PTSD is now classified. America's 2014 National Comorbidity Survey reports that "the traumas most commonly associated with PTSD are combat exposure and witnessing among men and rape and sexual molestation among women."

== Research ==
Most knowledge regarding PTSD comes from studies in high-income countries.

To recapitulate some of the neurological and neurobehavioral symptoms experienced by the veteran population of recent conflicts in Iraq and Afghanistan, researchers at the Roskamp Institute and the James A Haley Veteran's Hospital (Tampa) have developed an animal model to study the consequences of mild traumatic brain injury (mTBI) and PTSD. In the laboratory, the researchers exposed mice to a repeated session of unpredictable stressor (i.e. predator odor while restrained), and physical trauma in the form of inescapable foot-shock, and this was also combined with a mTBI. In this study, PTSD animals demonstrated recall of traumatic memories, anxiety, and impaired social behavior, while animals subject to both mTBI and PTSD had a pattern of disinhibitory-like behavior. mTBI abrogated both contextual fear and impairments in social behavior seen in PTSD animals. In comparison with other animal studies, examination of neuroendocrine and neuroimmune responses in plasma revealed a trend toward increase in corticosterone in PTSD and combination groups.

Stellate ganglion block is an experimental procedure for the treatment of PTSD. Several systematic reviews and meta-analyses suggest ketamine may produce short-term (≈24 h) reductions in PTSD symptoms, but overall evidence quality is low, long-term effects are unclear, and side effects occur.

In 2025, the FDA granted breakthrough therapy designation for methylone; it may have potential for the treatment of PTSD.

=== Psychotherapy ===
Trauma-focused psychotherapies for PTSD (also known as "exposure-based" or "exposure" psychotherapies), such as prolonged exposure therapy (PE), eye movement desensitization and reprocessing (EMDR), and cognitive-reprocessing therapy (CPT) have the most evidence for efficacy and are recommended as first-line treatment for PTSD by almost all clinical practice guidelines. Exposure-based psychotherapies demonstrate efficacy for PTSD caused by different trauma "types", such as combat, sexual-assault, or natural disasters. At the same time, many trauma-focused psychotherapies evince high drop-out rates.

Most systematic reviews and clinical guidelines indicate that psychotherapies for PTSD, most of which are trauma-focused therapies, are more effective than pharmacotherapy (medication), although there are reviews that suggest exposure-based psychotherapies for PTSD and pharmacotherapy are equally effective. Interpersonal psychotherapy shows preliminary evidence of probable efficacy, but more research is needed to reach definitive conclusions.

== Other animals ==
Non-human animals cannot officially be diagnosed with PTSD. However, PTSD-like symptoms have been observed in multiple species. Canines and felines can develop temperament changes, fears, avoidance symptoms, and aggression following traumatic events. Up to 5% of former military working dogs show extreme changes after deployment in combat zones.

Captive chimpanzees subjected to environmental stress can display severe symptoms, including emotional instability, hypervigilance, aggression, social withdrawal, self-harm, and apparent dissociation. These symptoms gradually improved following placement in a safe environment and medical care.

Elephants exposed to stressors such as poaching, maternal separation, or physical abuse can develop persistent trauma responses. Affected elephants may have poor impulse control, flinch, get startled easily, charge at humans or animals unprovoked, fear trauma-related stimuli, or avoid other elephants (which is not normal for that species). One study found elephants who'd been traumatized as juveniles had more serious and persistent symptoms. It has been suggested that a fraction of trauma-exposed elephants show signs of complex PTSD; however, there is limited evidence of this.

== See also ==
- Childbirth-related post-traumatic stress disorder
- Extreme weather post-traumatic stress disorder
- PTSD in children and adolescents
- Internet interventions for post-traumatic stress
- Internet-based treatments for trauma survivors
- Post-traumatic embitterment disorder
- Post-traumatic growth
- Post-traumatic stress disorder after World War II
- Post-traumatic stress disorder and substance use disorders
- Perpetration-induced traumatic stress
- Symptoms of victimization
- Trauma-informed mindfulness
- Traumatic stress
- Impact of prostitution on mental health
- Ibogaine treatment
