= Genetics of post-traumatic stress disorder =

The genetic influences of post-traumatic stress disorder (PTSD) are not understood well due to the limitations of any genetic study of mental illness; in that, it cannot be ethically induced in selected groups. Because of this, all studies must use naturally occurring groups with genetic similarities and differences, thus the amount of data is limited. Still, genetics play some role in the development of PTSD.

== Research and potential influences ==
Approximately 30% of the variance in PTSD is caused by genetics alone. For twins exposed to combat in the Vietnam War, a monozygotic (identical) twin with PTSD was associated with an increased risk of the co-twin having PTSD, as compared to dizygotic (non-identical) twins; additionally, assaultive trauma (compared to non-assaultive trauma) was more likely to exacerbate these effects.

There is also evidence that those with a genetically smaller hippocampus are more likely to develop PTSD following a traumatic event.

Research has also found that PTSD shares many genetic influences common to other psychiatric disorders. Panic and generalized anxiety disorders and PTSD share 60% of the same genetic variance. Alcohol, nicotine, and drug dependence share greater than 40% genetic similarities. Additional disorders—such as depression, schizophrenia, and bipolar disorder—share the same fundamental genetic phenotypes as PTSD.

=== Nature vs. nurture ===
An individual's potential for onset of many psychological disorders is heavily affected by genetic phenotypes, yet this is not the only contributing factor. Environment plays an important role as well, especially for trauma-based disorders such as PTSD, considering that certain life experiences can trigger the activation of an underlying genetic phenotype which might have been previously dormant. This can be further understood by examining the diathesis-stress model for the onset of psychological disorders, which explains that certain individuals, due to their genetic phenotypes, are more susceptible to psychological disorders when encountering the same stressful life situations or stimuli as other individuals without these same underlying genetic phenotypes.

=== Effects of neurotransmitters and hormones ===
Gamma-aminobutyric acid (GABA) is the major inhibitory neurotransmitter in the brain. A 2009 study reported a significant interaction between three single nucleotide polymorphisms (SNP) in the GABA alpha-2 receptor gene and the severity of childhood trauma in predicting PTSD in adults. Another study found an association between a specific SNP of the RGS2 gene (Note: RGS2 encodes a protein that decreases G protein-coupled receptor signaling.) and PTSD symptoms in adults who experienced high environmental stress (hurricane exposure) and low social support.

Studies in 2008 found that several SNPs in the FKBP5 (FK506 binding protein 5) gene interact with childhood trauma to predict severity of adult PTSD. These findings suggest that individuals with these SNPs who are abused as children are more susceptible to PTSD as adults. This is particularly important given that FKBP5 SNPs have previously been associated with peritraumatic dissociation in medically injured children (that is, dissociation at the time of the childhood trauma), which has itself been shown to be predictive of PTSD. Furthermore, FKBP5 may be less expressed in those with current PTSD.

In 2011, another study found that a single SNP in a putative estrogen response element on the ADCYAP1R1 gene (Note: ADCYAP1R1 encodes pituitary adenylate cyclase-activating polypeptide type I receptor, or PAC1.) predicts PTSD diagnosis and symptoms in females. Incidentally, this SNP is also associated with fear discrimination. The study suggests that perturbations in the PACAP/PAC1 pathway are involved in abnormal stress responses underlying PTSD.

=== Environmental influences ===
PTSD is a psychiatric disorder that requires an environmental event that individuals may variously respond to. Because of this, gene-environment studies tend to be the most indicative of their effect on the probability of PTSD than studies of the main effect of the gene. Studies have demonstrated the interaction between the FKBP5 gene and childhood environment to predict the severity of PTSD. Polymorphisms in FKBP5 have been associated with peritraumatic dissociation in mentally ill children.

A 2008 study of highly traumatized, inner city African Americans demonstrated that four polymorphisms of the FKBP5 gene interacted with severity of childhood abuse to predict severity of adult PTSD symptoms. This finding was partially replicated in a 2010 study, which reported that within the African American population, the TT genotype of the FKBP5 gene is associated with the highest risk of PTSD among those having experienced childhood adversity, while those with this genotype that experienced no childhood adversity had the lowest risk of PTSD. In addition, alcohol dependence interacts with the FKBP5 polymorphisms and childhood adversity to increase the risk of PTSD in these populations.

A 2005 study found that FKPB5 mRNA was differentially expressed in emergency room trauma patients who were later diagnosed with PTSD. However, a 2009 study found FKPB5 mRNA expression was reduced in 9/11 survivors diagnosed with PTSD.

=== Genetic influences ===
Catechol-O-methyl transferase (COMT) is an enzyme that catalyzes the extraneuronal breakdown of catecholamines. The gene that codes for COMT has a functional polymorphism in which a valine has been replaced with a methionine at codon 158. This polymorphism has lower enzyme activity and has been tied to a slower breakdown of the catecholamines. A study of Rwandan genocide survivors indicated that carriers of the Val allele demonstrated the expected response relationship between the higher number of lifetime traumatic events and a lifetime diagnosis of PTSD. However, those with homozygotes for the Met/Met genotype demonstrated a high risk of lifetime PTSD independent of the number of traumatic experiences. Those with Met/Met genotype also demonstrated a reduced extinction of conditioned fear responses which may account for the high risk for PTSD experienced by this genotype.

Many genes impact the limbic-frontal neurocircuitry as a result of its complexity. The main effect of the D2A1 allele of the dopamine receptor D2 (DRD2) gene has a strong association with the diagnosis of PTSD. The D2A1 allele has also shown a significant association to PTSD in those having engaged in harmful drinking. In addition, a polymorphism in the dopamine transporter SLC6A3 gene has a significant association with chronic PTSD. A polymorphism of the serotonin receptor 2A gene has been associated with PTSD in Korean women. The short allele of the promoter region of the serotonin transporter (5-HTTLPR) has been shown to be less efficient than the long allele and is associated with the amygdala response for the extinction of fear conditioning. However, the short allele is associated with a decreased risk of PTSD in a low-risk environment, but a high risk of PTSD in a high-risk environment. The s/s genotype demonstrated a high risk for the development of PTSD even in response to a small number of traumatic events, but those with the l allele demonstrate increased rates of PTSD with increasing traumatic experiences.

A genome-wide association study (GWAS) offers an opportunity to identify novel risk variants for PTSD that will in turn inform our understanding of the etiology of the disorder. Early results indicate the feasibility and potential power of GWAS to identify biomarkers for anxiety-related behaviors that suggest a future of PTSD. These studies will lead to the discovery of novel loci for the susceptibility and symptomatology of anxiety disorders including PTSD.

== Epigenetics ==
Epigenetic modification is an environmentally induced change in DNA that alters a gene's function rather than its structure. Its biological mechanism typically involves the methylation of cytosine within a gene, which leads to decreased transcription and thus reduced expression of the gene. Epigenetic modification can offer insight into the importance of developmental timing of stressor exposure in producing the phenotypic changes associated with PTSD.

Neuroendocrine alterations seen in animal models parallel those of PTSD in humans, where low basal cortisol and enhanced suppression of cortisol in response to synthetic glucocorticoid becomes hereditary. Lower levels of glucocorticoid receptor (GR) mRNA have been demonstrated in the hippocampus of suicide victims with histories of childhood abuse. Although it has not been possible to monitor the state of methylation over time, the interpretation is that early developmental methylation changes are long-lasting and enduring. It is hypothesized that epigenetic-mediated changes in the HPA axis could be associated with an increased vulnerability to PTSD following traumatic events. These findings support the mechanism in which early life trauma strongly validates as a risk factor for PTSD development in adulthood by recalibrating the set point and stress-responsivity of the HPA axis.

Epigenetic mechanisms may also be relevant to the intrauterine environment. Pregnant mothers who developed PTSD from the 9/11 attacks produced infants with lower salivary cortisol levels, but only if the traumatic exposure occurred during the third trimester of gestation. These changes occur via transmission of hormonal responses to the fetus, leading to a reprogramming of the glucocorticoid responsivity in the offspring. Separate studies have reported an increased risk for PTSD and low cortisol levels in the offspring of female Holocaust survivors with PTSD.

== Evolutionary psychology ==
Evolutionary psychology interprets fear responses as adaptations that may have been useful in the ancestral environment to avoid or cope with various threats. In general, mammals display several defensive behaviors roughly dependent on how close the threat is: avoidance, vigilant immobility, withdrawal, aggressive defense, appeasement, and finally complete frozen immobility (the last possibly to confuse a predator's attack reflex or to simulate a dead and contaminated body). PTSD may correspond to and be caused by overactivation of such fear circuits. Thus, PTSD avoidance behaviors may correspond to mammal avoidance of and withdrawal from threats. Heightened memory of past threats may increase avoidance of similar situations in the future as well as be a prerequisite for analyzing the past threat and develop better defensive behaviors if the threat should recur. PTSD hyperarousal may correspond to vigilant immobility and aggressive defense. Complex post-traumatic stress disorder (and phenomena such as the Stockholm syndrome) may in part correspond to the appeasement stage and possibly the frozen immobility stage.

There may be evolutionary explanations for differences in resilience to traumatic events. For instance, PTSD is five to ten times less common following traumatic fires than physical abuse or combat. This may be explained by events such as forest fires long being part of the evolutionary history of mammals. In contrast, PTSD is much more common following modern warfare, perhaps because prolonged modern combat is an evolutionarily new development and very unlike the quick inter-group raids that are argued to have characterized the Paleolithic.
