= Internet-based treatments for trauma survivors =

Internet-based treatments for trauma survivors is a growing class of online treatments that allow for an individual who has experienced trauma to seek and receive treatment without needing to attend psychotherapy in person. The progressive movement to online resources and the need for more accessible mental health services has given rise to the creation of online-based interventions aimed to help those who have experienced traumatic events. Cognitive behavioral therapy (CBT) has shown to be particularly effective in the treatment of trauma-related disorders and adapting CBT to an online format has been shown to be as effective as in-person CBT in the treatment of trauma. Due to its positive outcomes, CBT-based internet treatment options for trauma survivors has been an expanding field in both research and clinical settings.

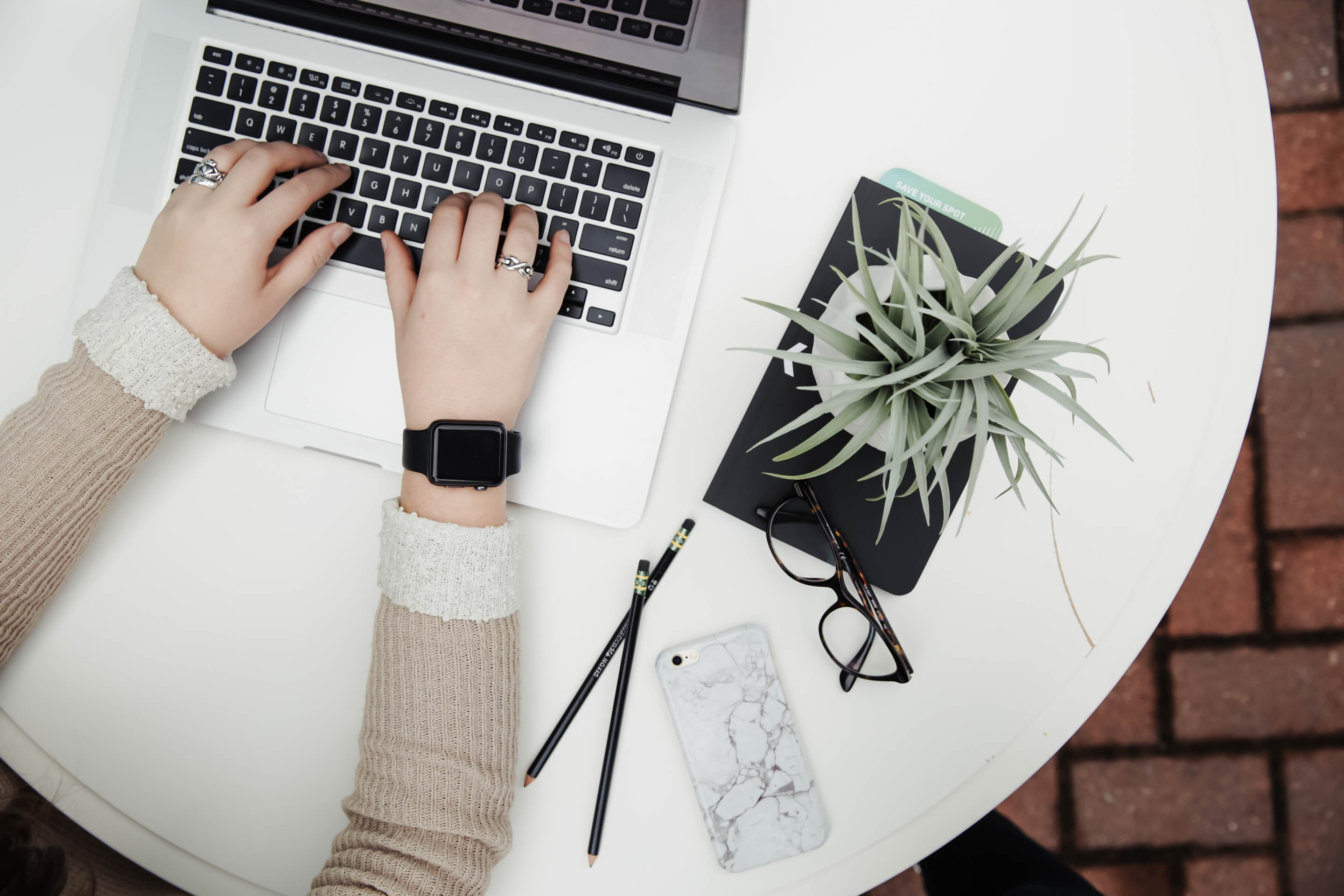

== Background ==
Telepsychiatry in the form of teleconferencing dates back to 1959, when it was used for research and consultation at the University of Nebraska. Then in 1968, successful emergency consultation services were provided via telehealth delivered in Boston and New Hampshire. With the development of larger systems of operation, such as universities and federal health systems, telemental health services began seeing an uptake in research and randomized control trials in the 1990s. Progress continued at a steady pace until 2003, when there was a notable change in the amount of advancement made in this area. Despite early research and success in using telemental health in the treatment of disorders such as anxiety and behavioral problems, more recently, tailoring treatment for trauma survivors to an internet-based format has been gaining momentum.

The growing interest in internet-based treatment options is a result of numerous factors. Convenience is one major reason for the creation and development of such formats. Internet-based treatment options allow for the user to choose when and where to access their program and can more easily fit treatment into their schedule, including after-hours treatment. Anonymity is another reason why users would want to turn to such programs, especially if they feel embarrassed about their reasons for seeking help. Cost-effectiveness, accessibility for those who live in more isolated or rural areas and for those of marginalized or minority populations are other reasons. Furthermore, limitations occur that hinder people from attending in-person therapy, including childcare, transportation, or getting time off of work. The development of internet-based treatment options allows individuals with these reasons or limitations to be able to access care without the need for in-person interaction.

== Formats ==
Internet-based treatment options for trauma-related symptomatology exist in the forms of healthcare-supported telehealth options, mobile applications (apps), online group and peer support, and online resources provided by organizations.

=== Healthcare-supported telemental health ===
Healthcare providers who have mental health services mostly have online psychotherapy options available, especially as a result of the shift to telemental health in the wake of COVID-19. These services can include both video and phone conferencing between professionals and clients. These providers treat a wide variety of mental disorders, including trauma and stress-related disorders. Options that are available through healthcare providers can include individual therapy through therapist-supported teleconferencing, virtual support groups, and other self-guided online resources.

=== Mobile apps ===
The advent of smartphone and tablet apps has allowed for an easily accessible platform that an individual can use flexibly within their own schedule. The Department of Veteran's Affairs (VA)'s National Center for PTSD has developed fifteen mobile apps, including seven apps that are designed to be used with a clinician, and eight self-guided apps that can be used either with or without a clinician. One of these apps, PTSD Coach, is the most well-known mobile app for treating PTSD and has been shown to be an acceptable intervention for those displaying PTSD symptoms. A growing number of mobile apps exist to aid in trauma-care and the high-quality and evidence-based apps have been found to be beneficial.

=== Group support ===
Videoconferencing telehealth group-based treatment options for trauma survivors have also been shown to be effective. Group support options can come in different forms, including health professional-assisted group sessions and peer-to-peer support. Furthermore, countless trauma and PTSD support groups exist online and have been found to be effective in lessening stress, depression, and trauma-related symptoms. Mobile app group and peer support have also become available and have been shown to be effective, as well.

=== Additional online resources ===
Additional organization websites also provide psychoeducation and other resources for children, adolescents, and adults, including the Substance Abuse and Mental Health Services Administration (SAMHSA) and other branches of the U.S. Department of Health and Human Services (HHS). Organizations and websites that provide information for opportunities to participate in research studies exist as well, including the International Society for Traumatic Stress Studies (ISTSS) and ClinicalTrials.gov.

== Alternatives to CBT-based treatments ==
Other treatment approaches can be found online, as well, including cognitive therapy for post-traumatic stress disorder (CT-PTSD). Eye Movement Desensitization and Reprocessing (EMDR) has been integrated into twelve mobile apps, though only six have been found to be acceptable to use in conjunction with a professional.

Though CBT has a mindfulness component, there are apps that are being specially developed to only focus on mindfulness as a means to aid in trauma-care, including one developed by the VA's National Center for PTSD called Mindfulness Coach. Prevention programs are also in the early stages of development and are aimed at high risk populations.

== Drawbacks of internet-based interventions ==
Though there are numerous advantages for the development and growth of internet-based interventions for trauma, there are also situations in which telehealth might not be beneficial. Children in abusive households could have trouble benefiting from telemental health options in that they may not have the ability to recognize dissociative symptoms, may not have a private space, may not be able to process their trauma when they are not in a safe space, and may not be able to pay attention due to emotion regulation problems. Similar patterns can also be seen in adult populations as well, such as during the COVID-19 pandemic related shelter-in-place orders that have impacted victims of domestic violence.

Other factors can contribute to an individual's inability to use internet-based resources, including individuals of lower socioeconomic status who may not be able to afford smartphones, computers, or other devices. Poor internet connections have also been a barrier to accessing care via the internet and can be a result of geographic location and internet plans. Older individuals and those with disabilities, such as hearing impairments or vision impairments, can also be at a disadvantage.

Another consideration with internet-based treatment options is the dropout rate. Similar to the dropout rates for using internet-based treatment options for other mental disorders, online trauma-focused interventions appear to have a generally high dropout rate, with a range of between 15 and 41% dropout rates during clinical trials. The gamification, or use of gaming elements, of mental health apps is one approach to addressing this issue and has been gaining support for improving adherence to app programs, as well as increasing resiliency.
