= The Minnesota Women Healthy Aging Project =

Neuroscience project

Started in 2010, The Minnesota Women Healthy Aging Project studies how brain changes with aging vary for different women and what might be the underlying causes of those differences. Initiated by Apostolos Georgopoulos, a Regents Professor of Neuroscience at the University of Minnesota, the premise for the project was inspired by a conversation with his wife, the endocrinologist Lily Georgopoulus, who had observed a small cohort of female patients who were thriving physically and mentally well into their 80s and 90s. Georgopoulos is working with Lisa James, an associate professor of Neuroscience at the University of Minnesota to construct a comprehensive, longitudinal database with information on cognitive abilities and genetic markers that can be used to understand the molecular biology of the aging brain. As of 2019, the study had enrolled over 100 women ranging in age from their 20s to 104 yrs old. Annual checkups are used to track the impact of genetic markers, brain images, diet, exercise and other lifestyle factors on cognitive changes in the women. The data has shown a link between a human leukocyte antigen and brain health with the HLA-DRB1*13:02 allele correlating with less brain damage and with cognitive health over time. This observation provides a molecular mechanism to explain the widely published observation that infections by certain pathogens, such as herpes virus, contribute to loss of brain function and increased incidence of Alzheimer Disease.
