= Post-traumatic stress disorder and substance use disorders =

Association of PTSD and substance dependencies

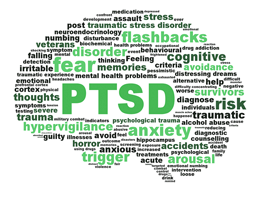

Post-traumatic stress disorder (PTSD) can affect about 3.6% of the U.S. population each year, and 6.8% of the U.S. population over a lifetime. 8.4% of people in the U.S. are diagnosed with substance use disorders (SUD). Of those with a diagnosis of PTSD, a co-occurring, or comorbid diagnosis of a SUD is present in 20–35% of that clinical population.

Prevalence of SUD and PTSD may increase depending on specific populations. For example, the prevalence of both PTSD and SUD is higher in combat veterans. Other populations that are disproportionately affected by both of these disorders include women, members of the black and hispanic populations, and members of the LGBTQ community. Alcohol use disorder (AUD) is the leading cause of SUD amongst veterans who have experienced trauma. While research indicates that alcohol is the most abused substance by those diagnosed with PTSD, additional substances with high abuse rates include other depressants such as cannabis and opiates, as well as the stimulant cocaine."

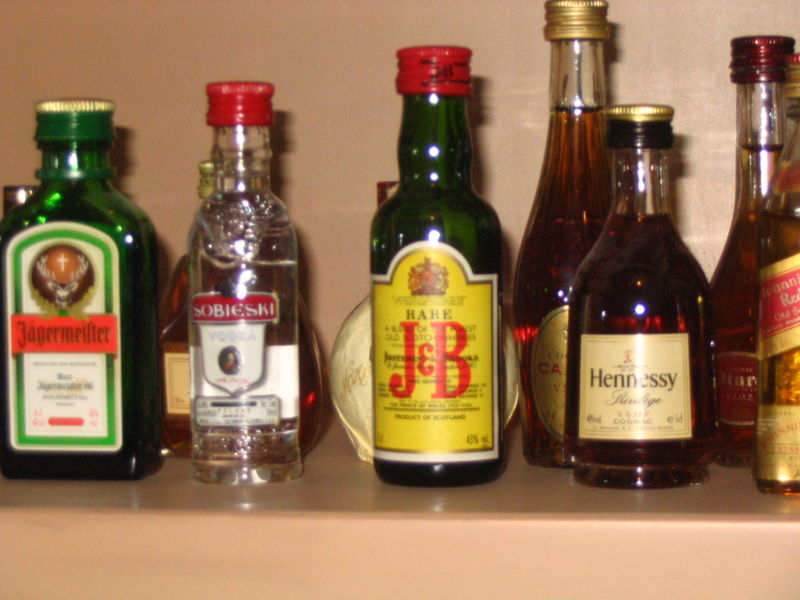
Various alcoholic beverages.

Worsening PTSD symptoms are associated with increased SUD and poor treatment response Of those with a SUD diagnosis, current PTSD is present in 25–50%, and lifetime PTSD is present in 15–40%, averaging 30% overall. Though roughly a third of all people diagnosed with SUD also have PTSD, there is not yet a consistent protocol for SUD treatment centers to screen for both PTSD and SUD symptomology upon intake.

The presence of both PTSD and SUD can hinder outcomes of those seeking treatment for either PTSD or SUD. A few different treatment options include trauma focused treatments such as psychotherapy, non trauma focused treatments, and pharmacological treatments like medications that can help reduce withdrawal symptoms or SSRIs.Those who experience both diagnoses may generally have poorer overall functioning and worse overall well-being than each diagnosis by itself. This can manifest as being hospitalized more frequently, experiencing increased levels of legal issues, have less social support, and have a harder time retaining employment. In treatment these individuals can have high dropout rates, respond poorly to the treatment of PTSD in general, have greater levels of addiction severity, and shorter periods of remission for substance use treatment.

== Etiological theory ==
Each of the subsequent theories about the causal link between PTSD and SUD have varying levels of empirical support. These etiological theories are not mutually exclusive, and features of more than one can be present for an individual with dual diagnoses of SUD and PTSD. No one clear etiological link has been established between SUD and PTSD.

=== Susceptibility hypothesis ===
The susceptibility hypothesis suggests that the substance use may increase the risk of PTSD developing after a traumatic event. Individuals who use substances may lack appropriate coping mechanisms to deal with daily stressors before the traumatic event, they may be less equipped than individuals who do not use substances to cope with extreme stress. Thus, these individuals may be more susceptible to developing PTSD following a traumatic event.

=== Implication of coping strategies ===
Coping style has recurrently been discussed as a third-party influence on the presence of dual diagnosis for PTSD and SUD. Avoidant coping styles have been shown to have a strong relationship to both PTSD and SUD individually, as well as presentation of concomitant PTSD and SUD together. Those with avoidant coping styles attempt to avoid interacting with or experiencing thoughts, feelings, or physical sensations reminiscent of the stressor in order to gain relief from the distress it causes. Substance use, for example, can allow a person to attempt to escape the distressing thoughts, feelings or physical sensations associated with the stressor the person is attempting to avoid experiencing. An avoidant coping style can therefore increase an individual's likelihood to seek means to avoid experiencing distressing sensations and increase likelihood of substance use overall.

== PTSD affects substance use disorders ==
Individuals with comorbid PTSD and SUD tend to engage in more frequent and heavier substance use than individuals who have SUD alone. Additionally, research suggests that symptoms of PTSD can hinder abstaining from substance use. More generally, individuals with a dual diagnosis of PTSD and SUD have shown to be at increased risk meeting criteria for other psychiatric diagnosis in additional to PTSD and SUD when compared to those with SUD alone. Those with a dual diagnosis of PTSD and SUD have also been shown to seek treatment at higher rates than those who experience SUD alone.

=== How substance use disorders affect PTSD ===
The self medication hypothesis, as well as behavioral and emotional conditioning plays a role for people with dual diagnoses of PTSD and SUD. Symptoms of withdrawal, increased heart rate, sweating can mirror a human's natural physiological responses to fear, and can therefore trigger fear responses associated with that person's traumatic experience. Those with comorbid PTSD and SUD diagnoses may seek to avoid experiencing withdrawal to avoid experiencing these sensations that can act as fear inducing and triggering experiential catalysts. Additionally, individuals who chronically use substances as a form of self-medication for PTSD symptoms strengthen an automatic mental link between PTSD symptoms and the substance use itself via conditioning. Stress is also a component of PTSD that may lead to drug use, due to the norepinephrine that is released from the stress response of the body. Therefore, conditioned link between PTSD and substance use may trigger craving for substances when it arises, potentially increasing psychological dependence and complicating treatment outcomes for both diagnoses.

== Implicated brain systems ==
=== Hippocampus and amygdala ===
The hippocampus, which is responsible for encoding memory within the brain, is implicated in both PTSD and SUD. PTSD and SUD have been found to interfere with typical hippocampal functioning. Studies of the involvement of the hippocampus in both sole PTSD and SUD diagnosis as well as comorbid PTSD and SUD evidence that the manifestation of these diagnosis are related to decreased hippocampal volume.

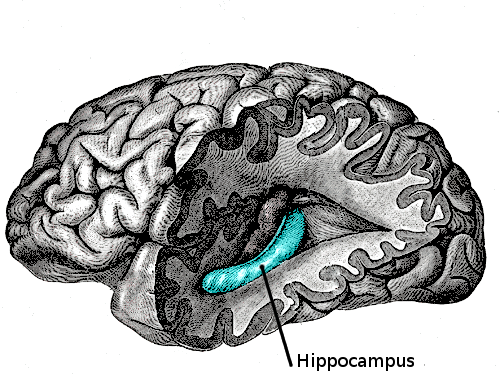

Hypothalamic pituitary adrenal axis and corticotropin-releasing hormone. The hypothalamic pituitary adrenal (HPA) axis is responsible for the activation of the hormonal stress response system within the human body. Corticotropin-releasing hormone (CRH) is activated by the HPA axis during times of stress. Heightened CRH levels have been shown during symptoms of PTSD (particularly for hyperarousal), drug seeking behavior, substance withdrawal, and drug relapse in humans. Research has conveyed that increased levels of CRH are also related to experiences of euphoria. As CRH levels are elevated in PTSD, this can personify feelings of euphoria experienced when an individual uses substances and increase addiction severity as a result of positive reinforcement from euphoric sensation. This can also affect the interplay between withdrawal symptoms and the increased experience of hyperarousal. As increased levels of CRH have been linked to both withdrawal and hyperarousal, those affected by both diagnoses of PTSD and SUD may subsequently continue to seek substances as a means to avoid these escalated aversive sensations. The described relationship has been used to evidence the self-medication hypothesis.

== Treatment options ==
Assessment of effectiveness of treatment for comorbid PTSD and SUD has fluctuated. While some treatments for cooccurring PTSD and SUD have shown promising in symptom reduction for both diagnoses, many have not evidenced the ability to be more effective than treatment of PTSD or SUD alone. This is further complicated by high rates of treatment dropout and substance relapse in studies of treatment in this population. Research has focused on two major forms of treatment for those with comorbid SUD and PTSD: treatments that focus on the traumatic experience(s), and treatments that do focus on traumatic experience(s). Research has not definitely concluded that any form of treatment adequately addresses the treatment needs of those who have both PTSD and SUD.

=== Non-trauma focused treatments ===
Treatments that are non-trauma focused do not emphasize the individual's exposure to the trauma memory as a means to treat both PTSD and SUD. Seeking safety is the most well-known non-trauma focused treatment for SUD and PTSD and is based on cognitive behavior therapy. The goal of seeking safety's is to increase the safety of the individual's coping style by addressing thoughts, behaviors, and interpersonal interactions for the individual seeking treatment. Additional non-trauma focused treatments include but are not limited to CBT for PTSD (CBT-P) in existing addiction treatment programs, substance dependency post-traumatic stress disorder (SDPT), and transcend therapy. Other non-trauma focused treatments also include holistic alternatives such as yoga, meditation and acupuncture, which have shown to be effective in treating PTSD and SUD specifically in victims of sexual assault and veterans.

=== Trauma focused treatments ===
Trauma focused forms of treatment aim to focus on, process, and identify the meaning of the traumatic experience of the individual while concurrently addressing needs of comorbid SUD. A modified version of seeking safety, seeking safety plus exposure therapy revised, incorporates imagined exposure to the traumatic event into the seeking safety treatment protocol. Concurrent treatment of PTSD and cocaine dependence (CTPCD), also referred to as concurrent treatment of PTSD and substance use disorders with prolonged exposure (COPE), merges typical prolonged exposure protocol for the treatment of PTSD with CBT protocol for SUD. Symptom outcomes have shown improvement in the assessment of the efficacy of trauma-focused treatments for both PTSD and SUD, however effects of the treatment have been small, and they have not evidenced ability to treat both disorders over and above the treatment of either PTSD or SUD alone. Of note, research has conveyed that exposure-based treatments for individuals with PTSD and SUD see high dropout rates, with rates typically peaking around the session that introduces exposure of trauma-based memories to the client. This has created impediments for assessing the efficacy of trauma-focused therapies for people with both SUD and PTSD compared to assessing the efficacy of treating PTSD and SUD separately.

=== Pharmacological and integrated psychotherapy treatments for PTSD and AUD ===
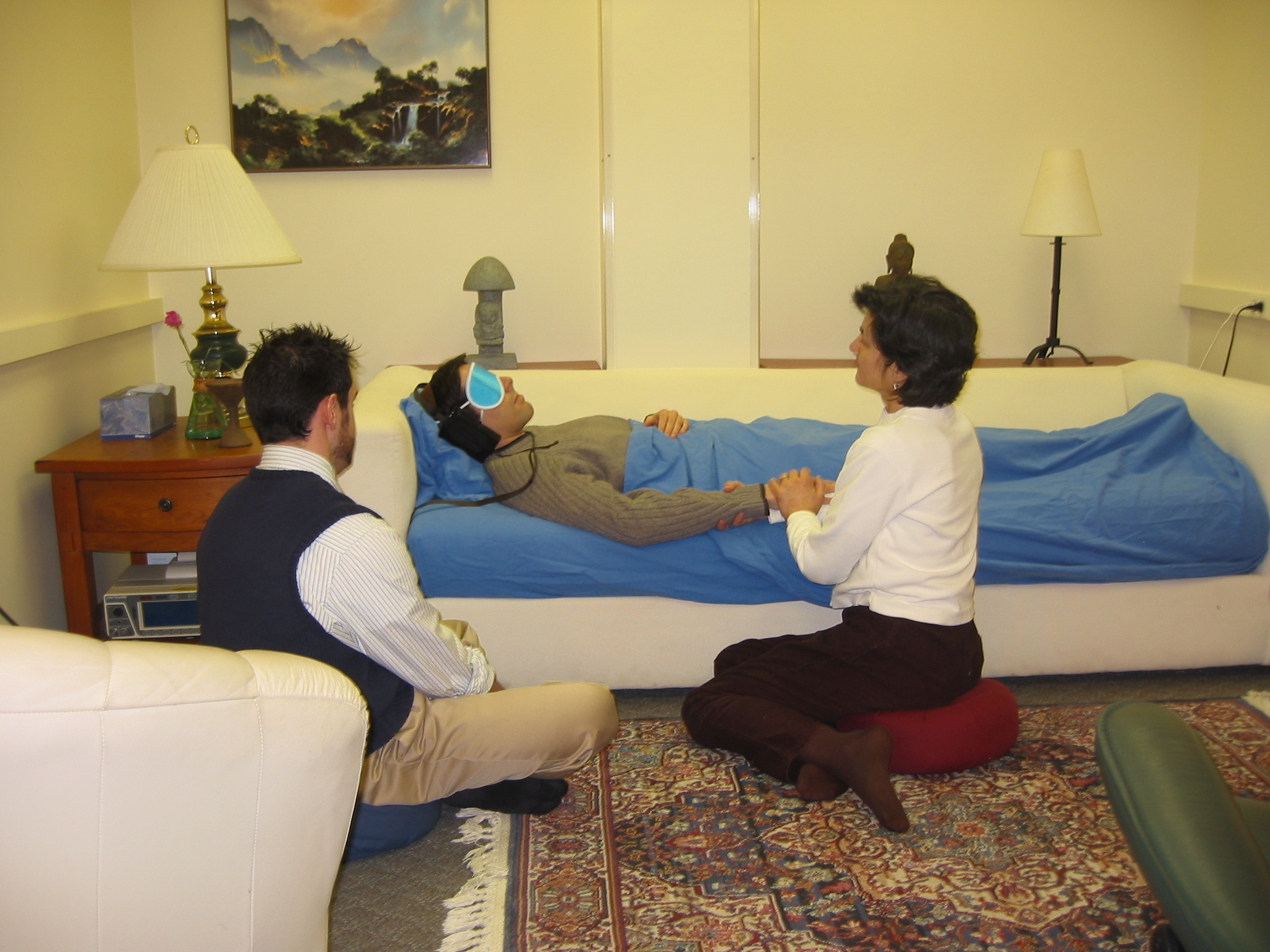
Research study at Johns Hopkins using psilocybin for depression symptoms

Pharmacological interventions alone or in combination with psychotherapy have been examined in the treatment of the PTSD and AUD comorbidity, with varying success. The opioid antagonist naltrexone is generally effective when administered alone in reducing drinking outcomes, with no effect on PTSD symptoms, while the selective serotonin reuptake inhibitor (SSRI) sertraline is generally ineffective in reducing PTSD symptoms or AUD symptoms when administered without psychotherapy. Research integrating naltrexone with an exposure-based treatment for PTSD, such as prolonged exposure, has demonstrated modest support for this integrative framework on the reduction of drinking outcomes and amelioration of PTSD symptoms. New research is currently evaluating the effects of classic psychedelics, including MDMA, psilocybin, LSD, and ayahuasca, on both PTSD and SUD. Current results have found that psychedelic therapy has had successful results in the treatment of both disorders, especially with MDMA and psilocybin.
