= Mailman (disambiguation) =

A mailman is a person who delivers mail.

Mailman may also refer to:

== Arts ==
- The Mailman (1923 film), an American silent drama film
- The Mailman (2004 film), a psychological thriller film
- Mailman (novel), a 2003 novel by American author J. Robert Lennon
- The Mailman (novel), a 1991 novel by Bentley Little
- "Mailman" (Adderly), a 1986 television episode

=== Music ===
- The Mail Man, a 1993 album by American rapper E-40
- "Mailman", a song by Soundgarden from Superunknown

== People ==
- Bruce Mailman (1939–1994), American theatre owner
- Deborah Mailman (born 1972), Australian actress
- Erika Mailman, American writer and journalist
- Joseph Mailman, American philanthropist
- Martin Mailman (1932–2000), American composer
- Stetson Bennett (born 1997), American football player nicknamed "the Mailman"
- Karl Malone (born 1963), American basketball player nicknamed "the Mailman"

== Other uses ==
- GNU Mailman, mailing list software
- Mailman Group, a Chinese media company

== See also ==
- Mehlman
- Melman
- Milman
- Millman
