= Zillmann =

Zillmann may refer to:

== People ==
- Dolf Zillmann (born 1935), Polish-American Professor of Information Sciences, Communication and Psychology at the University of Alabama
- Johann Leopold Zillmann (1813–1892), German missionary to Australia
- Karoline Zillmann (born 1985), German long track speed skater
- Katarzyna Zillmann (born 1995), Polish rower, Olympic medalist

== Other uses ==
- Großer Zillmann Lake, Mecklenburg-Vorpommern, Germany
- Lake of Kleiner Zillmann, Mecklenburg-Vorpommern, Germany
- Meister Zillmann (Master Zillmann), a 1965 novel by Herbert Nachbar

== See also ==
- Zillman
