= List of assets owned by TKO Group Holdings =

TKO Group Holdings (TKO) is an American sports and entertainment company, which is majority-owned by the WME Group (formerly known as Endeavor). Established on September 12, 2023, the public company was formed by a merger between Endeavor subsidiary Zuffa, LLC—the parent company of the Ultimate Fighting Championship (UFC), a mixed martial arts promotion—and the professional wrestling promotion World Wrestling Entertainment, Inc. (WWE). At the close of the Zuffa–WWE merger to form the TKO Group, all Zuffa and WWE assets were transferred to a subsidiary named TKO Operating Company, LLC (TKO OpCo). (Note: TKO OpCo was formerly known as Zuffa Parent, LLC.)

The following is a list of assets that are owned by TKO Group Holdings. As of 2026, TKO's assets are reported under six main businesses: WWE, UFC, Professional Bull Riders (PBR), On Location, IMG, and Zuffa Boxing.

== World Wrestling Entertainment (WWE) ==
- World Wrestling Entertainment, LLC
  - Lucha Libre AAA Worldwide (51% with Fillip)
  - Tapout (50% with Authentic Brands Group)
    - Tapout Drinks
  - WCW Inc.
  - WWE Books
  - Club WWE
  - WWE Performance Center
    - WWE Performance Center (US)
    - WWE Performance Center (UK)
  - WWE Recruit
    - WWE Independent Development
    - WWE Next in Line
  - WWE Vault
  - WWE Music Group
  - WWE Studios
    - WWE Studios Finance Holding
      - Erebus Pictures
      - NOLA Temple
      - Good and Bad Cop, LLC
      - Temple Picture Holdings
      - Avaros Films
      - BG Films
      - The Marine 6 Films
      - WH2, LLC
      - Hooked Movie
      - Main Event Films
      - Main Event Movie
      - Buddy Games Films
      - Fighting Family Limited
      - FWMF, LLC
      - CC Reality LLC
      - ELC Reality LLC
      - Six Cylinder Reality
      - Quest Reality
    - WWE Films Development
      - WWE Studios Production
      - Previous Films Production Corp
      - Marine 3, LLC
      - Incarnate Investments, Inc.
      - SLH Films
      - Railway Films
    - WWE VO Productions LLC
    - Studios Originals, Inc
    - WWE TE Productions, Inc.
  - WWE Libraries (WWE Legacy Department)
    - American Wrestling Association
      - Minneapolis Boxing & Wrestling Club
    - Capitol Wrestling Corporation
    - Central States Wrestling (select footage)
      - Midwest Wrestling Association
    - Championship Wrestling from Florida
    - Championship Wrestling from Georgia
    - Deep South Wrestling (select footage)
    - Dragon Gate USA (select footage)
    - Evolve
    - Extreme Championship Wrestling
      - Eastern Championship Wrestling
    - Florida Championship Wrestling
    - Georgia Championship Wrestling (select footage)
    - Global Wrestling Federation
    - Heartland Wrestling Association (select footage)
    - International Championship Wrestling
    - Jim Crockett Promotions (select footage)
      - Eastern States Championship Wrestling
      - Mid-Atlantic Championship Wrestling
    - Maple Leaf Wrestling (select footage)
      - Queensbury Athletic Club
    - Memphis Championship Wrestling
    - Ohio Valley Wrestling (select footage)
    - Smoky Mountain Wrestling
    - Stampede Wrestling (select footage)
      - Big Time Wrestling
      - Klondike Wrestling
      - Wildcat Wrestling
    - St. Louis Wrestling Club
    - Ultimate Pro Wrestling
    - Universal Wrestling Federation
      - Mid-South Wrestling
      - NWA Tri-State
    - World Class Wrestling Association (select footage)
      - NWA Big Time Wrestling
      - World Class Championship Wrestling
    - World Championship Wrestling
    - World Wrestling Council (select footage)
      - Capitol Sports Promotions
  - Event Services, Inc.
    - WM Labor MGT, Inc.
    - Event Services (Nola), LLC
  - WWE Real Estate Holdings
    - The Studios at WWE
  - Marine Productions Australia
    - WWE Australia Pty Limited
  - WWE Properties International
    - WWE Middle East FZ-LLC
  - WWE UK Holdings
    - WWE Saudi Arabian Management Company
  - World Wrestling Entertainment (International) Limited
  - WWE Jet Services Inc.
  - TSI Realty Company
  - WWE Asia Pacific Pte, Ltd
  - WWE Japan
  - WWE Germany GmbH
  - TKO Global Partnerships
    - Breath Death Inc. (minority owner)
    - Rahm Inc. (minority owner)
      - Real American Beer

== Ultimate Fighting Championship (UFC) ==
- Zuffa, LLC
  - Ultimate Fighting Championship
    - Meta Apex
    - UFC Brazilian Jiu-Jitsu
      - UFC BJJ Opens
    - UFC Fight Pass
    - UFC Gym
      - UFC Fit
    - UFC Magazine
    - UFC Performance Institute
      - UFC Performance Institute (Las Vegas)
      - UFC Performance Institute Shanghai
      - UFC Performance Institute Mexico City
    - Ultimate Fighting Productions, LLC
      - Ultimate Fighting Productions International
  - Strikeforce (Forza, LLC) (Note: An American mixed martial arts promotion company that was purchased by Zuffa in 2011, who operated the company until 2013 when it merged with the UFC. Despite the promotion no longer being active, the holding company established by Zuffa is still listed as a TKO subsidiary per the company's SEC filings.)
  - World Extreme Cagefighting (WEC Holdings, LLC) (Note: An American mixed martial arts promotion company that was purchased by Zuffa in 2006, who operated the company until 2010 when it merged with the UFC. Despite the promotion no longer being active, the holding company established by Zuffa is still listed as a TKO subsidiary per the company's SEC filings.)
  - Dana White's Contender Series (DWTNCS, LLC)
  - Zuffa International, LLC
  - Zuffa Zen
  - Zuffa UK
  - Zuffa Sports & Culture Development
    - Zuffa Sports & Culture Development (Shanghai)
    - Zuffa Sports & Culture Development (Beijing)
  - Zuffa Singapore
  - Zuffa Music
  - Zuffa Marketing
  - Zuffa Ireland
  - Zuffa Interactive Investor
  - Zuffa Eventos Esportivos Brasil
  - Zuffa EA LTD
  - Zuffa Deportes Mexico
  - Zuffa Canada
    - Zuffa Canada Productions
  - Zuffa Brazil
  - Zuffa Australia
  - TKO Guarantor
    - TKO Worldwide Holdings

== IMG ==
- IMG Worldwide, LLC
  - Learfield (shared with Atairos Group)
    - Collegiate Licensing Company
    - Host Communications
    - ISP Sports
    - IMG Associations
    - IMG Learfield Ticket Solutions
    - IMG College Seating
    - IMG College Audio Network
  - Alfred Dunhill Links Championship
  - Abu Dhabi Golf Championship
  - Honda LPGA Thailand
  - FIVB Men's Volleyball Nations League (shared with Fédération Internationale de Volleyball)
  - FIVB Women's Volleyball Nations League (shared with Fédération Internationale de Volleyball)
  - The Wall Group
  - Trans World International
    - Trans World International, LLC – French Branch
    - Trans World Sport
  - SNTV (50% with Associated Press)
    - Sports News Television
    - Sport 24
    - Sport 24 Extra
    - EDGEsport
  - FC Diez Media
    - FC Diez Media Argentina
    - FC Diez Media Brazil Consultoria Em Marketing Eirelie
    - FC Diez Media Paraguay
  - Formula D (Formula Drift Holdings)
  - Art + Commerce
  - Mercedes-Benz Fashion Week Russia
  - Mercedes-Benz Berlin Fashion Week
  - Mercedes-Benz Fashion Week Miami
    - Miami Swim Week
  - New York Fashion Week
  - IMG Fashion
    - IMG Fashion Alliance
  - IMG Consulting
  - IMG Focus
  - IMG Replay
  - IMG eSports
  - IMG Events
    - IMG Events Canada
  - IMG Hong Kong
  - IMG Media
    - IMG Rights
    - IMG Production
    - IMG Media Japan
    - IMG Media Korea
    - IMG Media Netherlands
  - IMG Services (Thailand)
  - IMG Singapore
  - IMG Sports Development (Shanghai)
    - IMG Sports Development (Shanghai) Ltd. – Beijing Branch
  - IMG Sweden
  - IMG Doğuş (shared with Doğuş Group)
  - IMG Reliance (shared with Reliance Industries)
  - CC-TV IMG (shared with CCTV)
  - International Management Group Schweiz
  - International Management Group South Africa
  - International Management Group Saudi Arabia
  - IMM
  - MVE Management
  - Mailman Group
    - Mailman PTE
    - Shanghai Mailman Business Consulting Co., Ltd
    - Shanghai Mailman Business Consulting Co., Ltd. – Xuhai Branch
  - Seven League Limited
  - Asia Tour Media Pte. Ltd.
  - North America Sports Media Holdings, LLC
  - Stars on Ice
  - World's Strongest Man

== Professional Bull Riders (PBR) ==
- Professional Bull Riders, Inc.
  - American Bucking Bull
  - PBR Cowboy Bar (shared with The Cordish Companies)

== On Location ==
Note: On Location is also known as On Location Events and On Location Experiences.

- On Location Events, LLC
  - On Location LA
  - OL Experiences
  - On Location S.R.L.
  - On Location WC
    - On Location WC Canada
    - On Location WC, S. de. R.L. de C.V. (Mexico)
  - On Location SAS
  - On Location X
  - PrimeSport
  - Anthony Travel, LLC
  - Nomadic Entertainment
  - Kreate Inc.
  - Wiz-Team

== Zuffa Boxing ==
Note: Zuffa Boxing is a joint venture between the TKO Group and Sela, with Sela holding a controlling 60% stake and TKO holding a minority 40% stake.

- TKO Boxing Promotions, LLC
  - Zuffa Boxing (Boxing OpCo, LLC) (40% with Sela)
    - Zuffa Boxing Anti-Doping (shared with Combat Sports Anti-Doping)

== Former assets ==
Note: This is a list of assets formerly operated by either the TKO Group or its predecessors.

=== Divested ===
- Clarion Hotel and Casino – A casino and hotel on the Las Vegas Strip owned by WWE (then the WWF), as part of a planned "WWF Casino" project, from 1998 until 2000 when it was sold to the Mark IV Realty Group.
- Alpha Entertainment – A company founded by Vince McMahon, that WWE held a 23.5% stake in, which operated and owned the 2020 iteration of the XFL before selling the league to RedBird Capital Partners in August 2020.
- Titan Towers – An office building in Stamford, Connecticut owned by WWE from 1991 to 2025 before being sold to the MB Financial Group; served as WWE's global headquarters from 1991 until 2023.
- IMG Academy – A preparatory boarding school and sports training facility in Bradenton, Florida sold by IMG to Baring Private Equity Asia in 2023.
- IMG Arena – IMG's global sports betting portfolio, sold to Sportradar Group AG in November 2025.
- Australian Fashion Week – A week-long fashion industry event backed by IMG before they sold the event to the Bashful Group in November 2024.
- Toronto Fashion Week – A week-long fashion industry event backed by IMG before they sold the event to Freed Developments in December 2016.
- Miss Universe Organization – An organization that runs various beauty pageants, sold by IMG to JKN Global Group in October 2022.
  - Miss Universe – An international beauty pageant, backed by IMG until 2022.
  - Miss USA – An American beauty pageant that has been held annually since 1952 to select a US entrant for Miss Universe, backed by IMG until 2022.
  - Miss Teen USA – An American beauty pageant for girls aged 14–19 years old, backed by IMG until 2022.
- Tiger Aspect Productions – A British television and film production company that IMG sold to Endemol in November 2009.
- Darlow Smithson Productions – A British television production company that IMG sold to Endemol in November 2009.
- Nunet – A global provider of mobile and IPTV video management technologies that IMG sold to KIT Digital, Inc. in 2009.
- IMG Licensing – Spun-off from IMG in 2025, and remained as a division within its previous owner Endeavor.
  - IMG Global Brand Licensing – The global arm of IMG Licensing.
- IMG Models – Spun-off from IMG in 2025, and remained as a division within its previous owner Endeavor.
- MARI – A new company led by Ari Emanuel that was spun-off from IMG and Endeavor in 2025 after it acquired IMG's Arts & Entertainment and Action Sports portfolios.
  - Frieze Art Fair – A contemporary art organization, known for organizing international art fairs.
    - Frieze – An international contemporary art magazine, published eight times a year from London, England.
    - EXPO Chicago – A contemporary and modern art exhibition held each year in Chicago, Illinois.
  - Taste Festivals – A company that runs a series of food festivals around the world and organizes The Big Feastival and the World Restaurant Awards.
  - PWR Events – A live event producer in England and Wales.
    - Hampton Court Palace Festival – An annual musical event at Hampton Court Palace in London, England.
    - Hyde Park Winter Wonderland – An annual English Christmas winter wonderland fair held in Hyde Park, London.
  - GLIDE – A chain of open-air ice rinks.
    - GLIDE at Battersea Power Station – The British GLIDE location at Wandsworth's Battersea Power Station.
    - GLIDE at Brooklyn Bridge Park – The American GLIDE location at New York City's Brooklyn Bridge Park.
  - The Chimney Lift at Battersea Power Station – An amusement park attraction at Wandsworth's Battersea Power Station.
  - Barrett-Jackson – A collector car auction company and organizer of car shows.
  - Melbourne International Flower and Garden Show – A flower show held annually since 1995 in Australia.
  - Miami Open – An annual American professional tennis tournament held in Miami Gardens, Florida.
  - Mutua Madrid Open – An annual Spanish professional tennis tournament held in Madrid, Community of Madrid and sponsored by Mutua Madrileña.
  - Chengdu Open – An annual Chinese professional tennis tournament held in Chengdu, Sichuan.
  - Abu Dhabi Open – An annual professional women's tennis tournament held in Abu Dhabi, United Arab Emirates.
  - Giorgio Armani Tennis Classic at Hurlingham – An annual exhibition tennis tournament held in London, England.
  - US Open of Surfing – A week-long surfing competition held annually in Huntington Beach, California.
  - Melbourne Marathon – A 42.195 km marathon held annually in Melbourne, Australia.
  - Great Ocean Road Marathon – A long-distance run held annually in Victoria, Australia.
  - Escape from Alcatraz – A public triathlon held in California's San Francisco Bay Area.

=== Dormant or shuttered ===
- 120 Sports – An internet television service operated by Learfield IMG College that folded in 2017 after being merged into the Silver Chalice-owned Stadium sports network.
- Campus Insiders – A college sports website and internet television service that was a joint venture between Learfield IMG College and Silver Chalice, folded in 2017 after being merged into Stadium.
- Longhorn Network – A regional sports network owned as a joint venture between Learfield IMG College, The University of Texas at Austin, and ESPN that was focused on the Texas Longhorns varsity sports teams, folded in 2024.
- Los Angeles Fashion Week – A week-long fashion industry produced by IMG in conjunction with Smashbox Studios until October 2008.
- UFC Store – Dormant since 2024 after being outsourced by the UFC to Fanatics, Inc.
- WWE Shop – Dormant since 2022 after being outsourced by WWE to Fanatics, Inc.
- WWE Podcast Network – Dormant since 2025 after being outsourced by WWE to Fanatics, Inc.
- WWE Classics on Demand – A subscription video-on-demand service featuring archived programming, folded in 2014 and replaced by WWE Network.
- WWE Magazine – WWE's official print magazine, which started as a bi-monthly publication before switching to a monthly schedule and was eventually discontinued in 2014.
  - WWE Kids Magazine – A bi-monthly comic series, magazine, and website aimed at younger WWE fans, discontinued in 2023 (nine years after the dissolution of the main WWE Magazine).
- WWE Universe – A social media website managed by WWE, also formerly known as WWE Fan Nation and WWE InterAction, folded in 2011.
- WWE Niagara Falls – A retail store located in Niagara Falls, Ontario, Canada managed by WWE, folded in 2011.
- WWE Home Video – A video distribution and production company that distributed WWE programming via physical media, folded in 2023.
- WWE Network – A subscription video on-demand over-the-top streaming service managed by WWE, folded in 2026.
  - WWE Network (Canada) – The Canadian version of the WWE Network that operated as a specialty television channel ran by WWE and Rogers Sports & Media, folded in 2025.
- The World Entertainment, LLC – A company that managed a WWE-themed restaurant, nightclub, and retail store in New York City, New York, folded in 2003.
- Radio WWF – A syndicated radio station owned by WWE and hosted by Jim Ross and Johnny Polo, folded in 1993.
- Wrestle Vessel – A WWE subsidiary that ran a series of wrestling-themed cruise ship experiences, folded in 1999.
- WWF Racing – A WWE-owned NHRA Funny Car racing team, folded in 2000.
- World Bodybuilding Federation (WBF) – WWE's professional bodybuilding organization, folded in 1992.
  - Bodybuilding Lifestyles – The WBF's monthly magazine, folded in 1992.
  - ICOPRO – The WBF's bodybuilding supplement line, was discontinued in 1995 (three years after the WBF's dissolution).
- XFL – A professional American football league that was operated as a joint venture between WWE and NBC and played one season in 2001.
- Tout – An online social networking service and microblogging service, that WWE held a minority stake (5.2%) in. Folded in 2019.
- Pride Fighting Championships (Pride FC Worldwide Holdings, LLC) – A Japanese mixed martial arts promotion company that was purchased by Zuffa in 2007 and was merged into the UFC that same year.
- World Fighting Alliance (WFA Enterprises, LLC) – An American mixed martial arts promotion company that was purchased by Zuffa in 2006 and was immediately merged into the UFC.

== See also ==
- List of video libraries owned by WWE
