= Zillman =

Zillman is a surname. Notable people with the surname include:

- John Zillman (born 1939), Australian meteorologist
- William Zillman (born 1986), Australian rugby league player

== See also ==
- Millman
- Sillman
- Zillmann (disambiguation)
