= Excitation-transfer theory =

Psychological theory

Excitation-transfer theory, based heavily on psychology, psychophysiology, and biochemistry, is a psychological theory that originated in the field of social psychology and effects studies pertaining to communication. In the context of communication, this theory suggests that the emotional response to a particular message or stimulus can be influenced by the residual, or remaining, arousal from a previous experience. Excitation-transfer theory was first proposed by Dolf Zillmann in the 1970s to explain the emotional and physiological processes involved in the transfer of arousal from one situation to another.

This theory, which applies elements of the three-factor theory of emotions, states that left over, or residual, excitation from the initial stimulus will amplify the excitatory response or reaction to another stimulus, regardless of the hedonic valences or potential experience one has had with the emotions felt from the stimuli. Hedonic valence, in particular, refers to the emotional tone or affective quality of an experience, stimulus, or object. In addition, the excitation-transfer process is not limited to a single emotion, as the initial, residual, and excitatory emotional reactions do not have to be related.

The process of excitation-transfer occurs when the feelings of arousal, or another emotion of excitation, that stem from one stimulus is converted, or misattributed, into a different action or behavior due to a secondary stimulus. In addition, the transfer of one emotion to another will result in the second emotion directed toward the additional stimulus being felt more intensely than if the emotion caused by the first stimulus was not felt. Components including dispositional and excitatory emotional responses related to the three-factor theory of emotions are also correlated to the excitation-transfer process.

Developed research and applied studies in which this theory has been tested has led to the development of specific conditions required for the excitation-transfer process to occur. These conditions include time, shift of attention and hedonic assimilation. Examples of how the theory is applied are also provided.

In addition, research has also found limitations of excitation-transfer theory, which are noted as areas requiring further research.

== History ==
Dolf Zillmann began developing excitation-transfer theory in the late 1960s through the early 1970s and continued to refine it into the 21st century. The theory itself is based largely on Clark Hull's notion of residual excitation (i.e., drive theory), Stanley Schachter's two factor theory of emotion, and the application of the three-factor theory of emotions. Specifically, Zillmann noticed a fault within the two factor theory of emotion regarding the lack of information that addressed the relationship between cognitive behaviors and cues within the theory.

In these theories working as the starting point, excitation-transfer theory is able to make assumptions regarding how the transition of one emotion to another cognitively occurs. One of the assumptions states that excitation responses are, for the most part, ambiguous and are differentiated only by what emotions the brain assigns to them in that specific instance. This theory also helps to explain the variability of emotional arousal (including how it is possible for fear to be transferred into relief, anger into delight, etc.) and how the reaction to one stimulus can intensify the reaction to another.

During the development of excitation-transfer theory, the public became concerned about the potential real-world effects violent media content could have on consumers. As a result, excitation-transfer theory became one of the dominant theoretical foundations used for predicting, testing, and explaining the potential effects of media such as violent films, pornography, and music onto the population.

Furthermore, Zillmann also expressed that excitation transfer is not limited to face-to-face communication stimuli, as the process can occur from an array of stimuli including mediated messages. Research focusing on this theory has found a correlation between cognitive levels of arousal and behavioral actions as a result of the media being consumed.

== Three-factor theory of emotions ==
The three-factor theory of emotions works as a framework of application that allows excitation-transfer theory to categorize the emotional behaviors experienced through the excitation-transfer process, which include dispositional, excitatory and experimental.

The three-factory theory of emotions suggests that physiological arousal comes before and leads into both outward expressions of emotions (dispositional) and the subjective experience of emotions (experiential). The components of the theory include:

- Dispositional
  - This pertains to the skeletal-motor behaviors, including facial expressions, body language, or any other outward behaviors that convey emotions, which are associated with the excitation-transfer process.
- Excitatory
  - This factor refers to the physiological arousal associated with emotional experiences that include an increased heart rate and the physical release of adrenaline.
- Experiential
  - This component involves the cognitive appraisal of emotions, which can include a person's feelings, thoughts and personal interpretation of an emotional experience.

The way in which excitation-transfer theory applies the concepts of the three-factor theory of emotions are that it highlights the association of physiological arousal, dispositional behaviors, and subjective experiences across different emotional contexts. In addition, the utilization of the three-factory theory of emotions provides insight regarding how dynamic and influential emotional, arousing responses can be when transferred from one situation to another.

== Key concepts ==
Three major concepts of the excitation-transfer theory consist of:

=== Arousal ===
Arousal refers to a heightened state of physiological and psychological activity. It can be triggered by various stimuli, including emotional experiences (such as excitement or fear), physical activities (such as exercise), or intense situations (such as viewing thrilling media content).

=== Excitation ===
Excitation, within the excitation-transfer framework, refers to the residual physiological arousal left over from a previous event or experience. Furthermore, the lingering feelings of arousal can persist for a while after the initial stimulus has ended.

=== Transfer ===
Transfer occurs when the residual arousal, or excitation, from one event influences the emotional response to a following and seemingly unrelated event. This implies that the emotional intensity experienced in the first situation would be carried over and effect the reactions felt toward the second situation. The arousal transferred through this process can also amplify the emotional reaction to the new stimulus.

== Transfer conditions ==
The excitation-transfer process requires the presence of these three conditions:

1. The second stimulus should occur before the complete decay of residual excitation from the first stimulus, which is also referred to as temporal proximity. In other words, the remaining arousal felt from the initial stimulus needs to be present to some degree when the individual is exposed to the second stimulus.
2. After exposure to the second stimulus, the individual experiencing the excitation misattributes their emotions of excitation onto the second stimulus. Misattribution of excitation is a cognitive process where the individual mistakenly attributes the heightened physiological arousal to the second stimulus rather than recognizing its origin in the initial stimulus. This misattribution also contributes to the intensification of emotional responses to the second stimulus.
3. The individual has not reached an excitatory threshold before exposure to the second stimulus. In physiological arousal, the excitation-transfer process may only be able to occur if a certain limit, or threshold, of emotional response has not been met. In the case where an individual has already reached this emotional threshold before encountering the second stimulus, the excitation-transfer process may be less likely to occur.

Two additional components of excitation-transfer theory consist of:

1. The two arousing or emotional excitations being felt, one from the first stimulus and the other from the second stimulus, do not have to be related in any way.
2. The second feeling of arousing or emotional excitation will not last long after its occurrence. Zillmann estimated the secondary emotion only remaining for a few minutes after it is felt.

== Requirements ==
The requirements for the occurrence of excitation-transfer, particularly related to time, shift of attention, and hedonic assimilation, are important aspects of understanding how physiological arousal from one stimulus may affect the response to a secondary stimulus. Together, these factors provide a more comprehensive understanding of the mechanisms involved in excitation transfer.

=== Time ===
Time plays an essential, yet complex role in excitation transfer theory. Specific terms used to explain the importance of time in the emotional transfer process include:

=== Temporal proximity ===
The concept of time in this theory emphasizes that the transfer of excitation is typically more effective when there is a relatively short time interval between the initial arousal-inducing event and the subsequent stimulus.

=== Recency of arousal ===
The recency of the arousal is crucial in the sense that if the initial arousal is recent, the physiological activation it is associated with is more likely to be present during the encounter with the subsequent stimulus. This recency contributes to the transfer of excitation from one situation to another.l

=== Temporal decay ===
As time elapses, the physiological arousal from the initial event tends to disappear. The theory suggests that the transfer effect is most potent when the residual arousal is still present during the encounter with the second stimulus.

=== Response latency ===
Response latency refers to the time it takes for an individual to respond to a stimulus. In content of this theory, response latency may be able to enhance the likelihood of the excitation-transfer process occurring. For example, a short response latency may enhance the likelihood of the transfer of excitatory emotions.

=== Excitation delay ===
Excitation delay is the amount of time in between the initial arousal and the creation of the emotional response. This factor can influence the emotional transfer process, as a shorter excitation delay may result in a more effective transfer of arousal to a subsequent stimulus.

=== Time of recovery ===
Time of recovery refers to the duration of time it takes for physiological arousal to return to the baseline, or initially felt, emotion after experiencing the stimuli. To elaborate, a high time of recovery would imply that the physiological arousal persists for a longer timeframe without returning to the baseline emotion. This would imply that there is higher potential for the excitation-transfer process to take place and influence following situations. In addition, a low time of recovery would suggest a quicker return to the baseline emotion. This would diminish the potential for the excitation-transfer process to take place and influence preceding situations.

=== Shift of attention ===
For excitation-transfer theory, attentional shift guides the cognitive processing and selective attention that contribute to the transfer of emotions. Specific terms used to explain the importance of the shift of attention in the emotional process include:

Attentional shift
to the redirection of mental focus from the initial stimulus to the subsequent one. For excitation transfer to occur, individuals need to shift their attention from the source of initial arousal to the new stimulus. This shift allows the residual arousal to influence reactions to the second situation.
Selective attention
Individuals may selectively focus on aspects of the subsequent, or secondary, stimulus that are more likely to be influenced by the residual arousal.
Cognitive processing
The cognitive processing of the secondary stimulus is influenced by the remaining arousal from the previous experience. This processing contributes to the emotional and cognitive impact of the additional stimulus.

== Hedonic assimilation ==
Excitation-transfer theory and hedonic assimilation are related concepts that both pertain to the influence of prior experiences on current emotional responses. While excitation-transfer theory focuses on the transfer of arousal from one situation to another, hedonic assimilation is more specific in addressing how the affective tone (pleasant or unpleasant) of a prior experience can influence the evaluation of a subsequent and potentially unrelated stimulus. Zillmann proposed the idea that hedonic assimilation may serve as precondition needed in order for the excitation-transfer process of emotions to take place.

While both excitation-transfer theory and hedonic assimilation involve the influence of prior experiences on current emotional responses, they differ in the sense that excitation-transfer theory focuses more on the transfer of physiological arousal, while hedonic assimilation is most concerned with the transfer of the hedonic (emotional) tones.

== Examples ==
Using examples of how the excitation-transfer theory process works is beneficial, as it helps conceptualized the components and tangible effects of the theory.

=== Example A ===
Example - Watching a movie within the genre of thriller, suspense or horror.

Explanation - The initial stimulus would be the act or situation of watching a movie within one of these genres. Physical responses including an increased heart rate and elevated levels of adrenaline would be the physiological arousal components of the theory. If the heightened emotions from the physiology arousal transfer from watching the movie to an additional or subsequent situation, this experience would fall into the transfer of physiological arousal category. The transfer of emotions could appear as the viewer holding residual feeling of arousal that came from watching the movie that are then reflected onto another action or situation. The secondary action or situation may include answering a phone call with increased enthusiasm or excitement. This process would be considered misattribution of excitation.

=== Example B ===
Example - Riding a roller coaster ride at an amusement park.

Explanation - The initial stimulus would be the act of riding the roller coaster. Physical responses including an elevated heart rate and an adrenaline rush while on the ride are considered the physiological arousal components of the theory. If the heightened emotions from the physiology arousal transfer from the riding the roller coaster to an additional or subsequent situation, this experience would fall into the transfer of physiological arousal category. The transfer of emotions could appear as the rider holding residual feeling of arousal from riding the roller coaster that are then reflected onto another action or situation. This subsequent action or situation may include feeling extremely happy to see a friend after getting off of the ride, which would be considered the misattribution of excitation.

In both examples, the excitation-transfer process involves an initial stimulus (watching a thrilling, suspenseful, or horror-filled movie, or riding a roller coaster) that induces physiological arousal. This arousal transfers to a subsequent stimulus (answering a phone call or meeting a friend) and is misattributed to the new situation. As a result, this misattribution had the ability to influence a person's emotional and behavioral responses.

== Applications ==
=== Media violence and aggression ===
Researchers have found there to be a relation between excitation-transfer and the effect of media violence. This concept is explained in the sense that when media violence is observed by a viewer, the first stimulus, it will cause them to be emotionally aroused. When approached with a second stimulus soon after being aroused by the media violence, the emotional reaction to said stimulus will be far more intense because of the arousal from the initial stimulus.

=== Sexual media ===
Excitation-transfer theory, while offering insights, is just one perspective on the complex effects sexual media can have on audience members. The application of this theory to sexual media involves examining how physiological arousal generated by exposure to sexual content can transfer to subsequent situations that may influence emotional or behavioral responses. Research has also studied the potential effects of sexual media in terms of relationship dynamics, sexual attitudes, and the misattribution of arousal.

Additional areas where excitation-transfer theory can and has been applied through research include advertisements, humor and empathy.

== Limitations and areas for future research ==
Today, excitation-transfer theory remains a key component of the theoretical framework of studies focusing on communication and emotion. However, many current studies have run into limitations of the theory that require additional research to potentially build out the components of excitation-transfer theory.

=== Limitations ===
Limitations of excitation-transfer theory include:

- Excitation-transfer theory may not fully account for the complexity of situational factors that can influence the transfer of arousal. Conducted research has been able to find that some situational variables including the nature of the stimuli and individual differences can potentially interfere with the excitation-transfer process in ways that are not completely explained by the current components of the theory.
- The application of excitation-transfer theory can potentially place less emphasis on cognitive processes such as the interpretation of emotions, which may result in a limitation to its effects. Specifically, some research has shown that such cognitive factors can play a significant role in shaping emotional experiences. Thus, this theory may benefit from the integration of cognitive elements in order to provide a more comprehensive understanding of its effects.

=== Additional areas for further research ===
Based on previously conducted studies using this theory as a theoretical framework, areas where excitation-transfer theory can potentially be built out include:

- The potential relationship between excitation-transfer theory and priming theory in which the first stimulus works as a prime for the additional stimulus. Studies have tested the correlation between the two theories and found support for their relation, but because of the minimal research on the connection between excitation-transfer theory and priming theory, future research is required to determine if there is a relationship present.

== See also ==
- Two-factor theory of emotion
- Drive theory
- Misattribution theory of humor
- Misattribution of arousal
- Priming (psychology)
- Priming (media)
