= Misattribution =

Misattribution may refer to:

- Misattribution of arousal
- Misattribution of memory
- The misattribution theory of humor derived from work by Sigmund Freud
- False attribution, a deliberate or accidental association of authorship with the wrong person
