= Milliman (surname) =

Milliman is a surname. Notable people with the surname include:

- Jake Milliman, American professional wrestler
- James C. Milliman (1847–1933), American politician
- Peter Milliman, American lacrosse player and coach
- Wendell Milliman (1905–1976), American businessman

== See also ==
- Millman
