= Empathy in media research =

Empathy has long been a subject of communications research. Zillmann and Cantor (1977) indicated that regardless of the source of empathy, its existence predicts that viewers may vicariously experience the emotions displayed by the protagonist. Their research in empathetic reactions indicated that, at least in children, the actions and emotions of the protagonist had a direct effect on the viewers' enjoyment of the film.

== Definitions ==
Empathy has been defined in different ways in an attempt by researchers to clarify diverse aspects of the phenomenon. Dolf Zillmann, while at the University of Alabama, cited various meanings of empathy by fellow researchers that, on the surface, it may appear to conflict with one another. He nevertheless brushes this apparent conflict aside with the assertion that the common core of these various explanations is that they relate to a subject's emotional responses to and affinity with other peoples' emotions and their reactions to those emotions (p. 136).

Tamborini examined empathy as a “set of constructs,” among which are wandering imagination, fictional involvement, humanistic orientation, and emotional contagion. The first two constructs point to the imagination as a necessary criterion for empathy to occur. Those with a higher degree of imaginative tendency could be especially subject to a heightened empathetic experience. The third construct, humanistic orientation, refers to concern for the character. Under this construct, one may become deeply involved in the well-being of the character. By extension, one may become highly empathetic to the plight of the character. The fourth construct, emotional contagion, refers to the emotions of fellow viewers and the role they may play in influencing one's own emotions. Thus, the displayed emotions of those around one may affect one's own level, or type, of emotional display.

== Imagination ==
Tamborini et al. (1990) considered it reasonable to expect that imagination would be an important factor in empathy, given these constructs. One must be able to place oneself in the shoes of another to become deeply involved in the plight of the character. The implication could be that individuals with a stronger penchant for daydreaming might more readily form an empathic bond with a character, therefore experiencing a stronger emotional connection (p. 620).

== Television programming ==
Sparks indicated that it is not uncommon for reactions to frightening television programming to remain with one indefinitely. These reactions included “nervousness, sleep disturbances, and fear of going into certain rooms in the home.” This is attributed to arousal, which was also indicated by Zillmann as a potential factor in empathy. Sparks further suggested that subjects experiencing high arousal might be more susceptible to fright reactions than those who experience low arousal.

== Protagonists ==
Joanne Cantor suggested that “humans are naturally inclined to empathize with the emotions of protagonists". This may help explain potential long-term reactions that may accompany exposure to frightening content. Feeling close to the protagonist may enhance the depth of fear and helplessness a viewer might experience.

== See also ==
- Empathy
- Active Imagination
