= Media psychology =

Area of psychology

Media psychology is a branch of psychology that focuses on the interactions between human behavior, media, and technology. Media psychology is not limited to mass media or media content; it includes all forms of mediated communication and media technology-related behaviors, such as the use, design, impact, and sharing behaviors. This branch is a relatively new field of study because of technological advancements. It uses various critical analysis and investigation methods to develop a working model of a user's perception of media experience. These methods are employed for society as a whole and individually. Media psychologists can perform activities that include consulting, design, and production in various media like television, video games, films, and news broadcasting.

The field of media psychology explores how recent, newer social media apps like Instagram, TikTok, and Snapchat have become more popular and how they are creating new media and mental health challenges that are not widely researched. Newer apps like Instagram and Snapchat have changed how people consume media, communicate, and deal with their self-image. These social media platforms have introduced complex mental dynamics that may contribute to mental health challenges like negative body image, depression, and anxiety, which could affect users and add to unhealthy media psychology effects. In response, researchers have started to focus their studies on these platforms' psychological effects, specifically the effects on younger users, looking into issues like social comparison and body image.

== History ==
Media psychology overlaps with various fields such as media studies, communication science, anthropology, education, and sociology. Research on media psychology has evolved, and most of the research that is considered 'media psychology' has come from other fields, both academic and applied.

=== 1920-1940s ===
In the 1920s, marketing, advertising, and public relations professionals began researching consumer behavior and motivation for commercial applications. The use of mass media during World War II created a surge of academic interest in mass media messaging, creating a new field, communication science (Lazarsfeld & Merton, 2000).

=== 1950-1980s ===
Media psychology gained prominence in the 1950s when television became popular in American households. Psychologists responded to widespread social concerns about the children and their television viewing. For example, researchers began to study the impact of television viewing on children's reading skills. Later, they began to study the impact of violent television viewing on children's behavior, for example, if they were likely to exhibit anti-social behavior or to copy the violent behaviors that they were seeing. These events led up to the creation of a new division of the American Psychological Association in 1987. Division 46, the Media Psychology Division (now the APA Society for Media Psychology and Technology), is one of the fastest growing in the American Psychological Association.

=== 2000s ===
Today, media psychologists have expanded their focus to study newer technology and platforms like cellular phone technology, the internet, and social media. Platforms like Instagram, TikTok, and Snapchat have become important areas of study as these apps have increased incidences of social comparison, body image concerns, and technology addiction. TikTok, particularly with its fast-paced content and short videos, has been associated with increased anxiety and depression rates among younger users. This increase is caused by the glamorization of influencers and excessive exposure to idealized lifestyles, creating unrealistic expectations for users and causing negative self-images. In contrast to some of these effects, related media consumption practices such as Comfort television involve returning to familiar content for relaxation and emotional regulation.

== Theories ==
Media psychology's theories include the user's perception, cognition, and humanistic components in regards to their experience to their surroundings. Media psychologists also draw upon developmental and narrative psychologies and emerging findings from neuroscience. The theories and research in psychology are used as the backbone of media psychology and guide the discipline itself. Theories in psychology applied to media include multiple dimensions, i.e., text, pictures, symbols, video and sound. Sensory Psychology, semiotics and semantics for visual and language communication, social cognition and neuroscience are among the areas addressed in the study of this area of media psychology. A few of the theories employed in media psychology include:

=== Affective disposition theory ===
The concept of affective disposition theory is used to differentiate users' perspectives on different forms of media content and the differences within attentional focus. The theory consists of four components that revolve around emotion: (1) media is based on an individual's emotions and opinions towards characters, (2) media content is driven from enjoyment and appreciation from individuals, (3) individuals form feelings about characters that are either positive or negative and (4) media relies on conflicts between characters and how individuals react to the conflict.

=== Social comparison theory ===
Social comparison theory is a key media psychology theory that states that people determine their worth by comparing themselves to others. Social media apps like TikTok and Instagram add to this issue, as their platforms make it easy for users to constantly compare themselves to the fabricated lives of influencers seen online. Many individuals compare themselves upward, meaning they are comparing themselves to people they perceive as more attractive, successful, or accomplished compared to themselves. Upward comparisons can cause people to feel dissatisfied with their lives, have lower self-esteem, and not live up to the unrealistic standards seen online and portrayed in society.

The mental health implications of this behavior are particularly concerning. Adolescents and young adults, who often use social media with minimal restrictions or guidance, are especially vulnerable. Due to the pressure to mold to the idealized beauty and lifestyle standards of society, Instagram and TikTok are linked to increased feelings of anxiety, depression, and low self-esteem. These platforms could encourage social comparison, creating a cycle of negative self-perceptions.

This harmful cycle is escalated by the increased popularity of social media influencers, who share highly crafted videos that present their lives in unrealistic, fabricated ways. Young teen girls are vulnerable to this cycle as they try to meet these unrealistic lifestyle and beauty standards portrayed by influencers, which leads to continued social comparison and dissatisfaction with one's life, body, and achievements. Social media and influencers heighten the adverse effects of the social comparison theory, which is concerning because influencers' opinions and content can shape how users view what is typical or expected of life in society.

=== Simulation theory ===
Simulation theory argues that mental simulations do not fully exclude the external information that surrounds the user. Rather that the mediated stimuli are reshaped into imagery and memories of the user in order to run the simulation. It explains why the user is able to form these experiences without the use of technology, because it points to the relevance of construction and internal processing.

=== Psychological theory of play ===
The psychological theory of play applies a more general framework to the concept of media entertainment. This idea potentially offers a more conceptual connection that points to presence. The activity of playing exhibits consistent results to the use of entertainment objects. This theory states that play is a type of action that is characterized by three major aspects:

1. It is intrinsically motivated and highly attractive.
2. It implies a change in perceived reality, as players construct an additional reality while they are playing.
3. It is frequently repeated.

The psychological theory of play is based upon the explanations given by eminent people such as Stephenson, Freud, Piaget, and Vygotsky. The theory is based on how an individual uses media for their satisfaction and how media changes within a person's life according to its contents. Play is used for pleasure and is self-contained. People are influenced by media both negatively and positively because we are able to relate to what we see within the environment. By looking more in-depth at the different forms of play, it becomes apparent that the early versions of make-believe play demonstrate the child's need for control and the desire to influence their current environment. The theory explains the allure play has to humans in its many forms. In video games, which replicate the feeling, players hold some aspect of responsibility in the actions that they take within the world of the game. This can allow players to feel successful and powerful. It replicates the feeling of self-efficiency and proficiency within the video game. The experience of defeat is also replicated. In addition to that, in the case of defeat, players are not able to blame their mistakes on anyone but themselves. These all explain some aspects of the pleasure that comes from play.

=== Cultivation Theory ===
Cultivation theory, developed by George Gerbner, proposes that television changes the way viewers see the world. Through exposure to repetitive television, viewers begin to see life in a distorted lens formed by the media they consume. An example of this can be seen in adolescents who may form sexual expectations for their own life that come from sexual experiences they see in the television they watch.

== Effects of social media on mental health ==
The earliest research done on the effects of media on mental health focuses on the effects of traditional platforms like the radio and television, ignoring the importance and impact newer apps like Instagram, TikTok, and Snapchat have on mental health. While social media can be used as a space for creating connections and exploring creativity when used responsibly, it can be used excessively and unsafely, which can lead to psychological challenges.

Social media platforms are created in addictive ways to keep users engaged. These platforms are tailored to users' preferences, so they continue to see the media they relate to, causing prolonged exposure and engagement. Features like ads, alerts, and personalized recommendations cause users to keep coming back to their favorite social media apps. The addictive design of popular apps, especially the design of TikTok, is an essential factor as to why it contributes to worsening mental health. Many younger TikTok users state that when on the app, they usually lose track of time and spend more time than they anticipated watching videos, explaining they were so immersed in TikTok and could not put their phone down, even though they should. This addiction-driven model is problematic, as it can lead to issues with obsessive social media use despite knowing the effects it can have on relationships, mental health, and physical health. As of 2022, 95% of teenagers have access to smartphones, 67% regularly use TikTok, and 60% on Instagram and Snapchat. An alarming 54% of teens report that giving up their favorite social media apps would be challenging because they have a significant hold on their daily lives.Additionally a recent study did a deep dive on the relationship between social media use and loneliness. The results of the study revealed the more time spent on social media the more lonely the person felt.

Social media apps strive to elicit an emotional response in users. Hence, they return, causing higher instances of media addiction, zoning out, fear of missing out, and anxiety or depression. Social media use has also been linked to decreased, disrupted, and delayed sleep, which can worsen depression, memory loss, and poor academic performance.

Teenagers often use social media late at night when they should be using that time for rest. Many users use TikTok during overnight overs, disrupting sleep. Excessive screen use, especially in the hours before bed, can result in delayed sleep, a reduction in quality of sleep, and heightened risks of depression, suicidal thoughts, mood disturbances, attention problems, and physical issues like weight gain.

Another adverse effect social media can have on mental health is internet addiction disorder (IAD), which is the compulsive and unhealthy use of the internet and social media that causes disruptions to daily life.

== Media psychology and technology ==
Media psychology involves all the research and applications which deal with all forms of media technologies. The media psychology comprises the prevailing customary and mass media, including radio, television, newsprint, magazines, music, film, and video. It comprises art with new emerging technologies and applications that include social media, mobile media, and interface design. media psychology enables us to create a better and new trajectory concerning how people think about, use, and design media technology in medial platforms. It helps provide tools that aid in identifying how technology has facilitated human goals. It also analyzes how the media becomes inadequate and the inadvertent outcomes of performance shifts, which determine better or worse applications.

The media psychology leads to the shift of the general focus from the center of inquiry in the given media-centric to the basic human-centric, leading to the enhancement of communication in the whole sector of media psychology. The use of marketing and public relations has made tremendous help in the whole media psychology analysis whereby customer research and media psychology have given different goals that do not go hand in hand with the other marketing and public relations sectors. The use of technology has enabled the improvement of global connection, limiting traditional activities and advancing the media sector. The media advancement led to the more beneficial platform, which was possible to pass judgment, produce, and distribute analysis to the required platforms.

== Major contributors ==
Major contributors to media psychology include Marshall McLuhan, Dolf Zillmann, Katz, Blumler and Gurevitch, David Giles, and Bernard Luskin. Marshall McLuhan is a Canadian communication philosopher who was active from the 1930s to the 1970s in the realm of Media Analysis and Technology. He was appointed by the President of the University of Toronto in 1963 to create a new Centre for Culture and Technology to study the psychological and social consequences of technologies and media. McLuhan's famous statement pertaining to media psychology was, "The medium is the message". McLuhan's famous statement was suggestive towards the notion that media are inherently dangerous. McLuhan's theory on media called "technological determinism" would pave the way for other people to study media.

Dolf Zillmann advanced the two-factor model of emotion. The two-factor of emotion proposed that emotion involves both psychological and cognitive components. Zillmann advanced the theory of "Excitation transfer" by establishing the explanation for the effects of violent media. Zillmann's theory proposed the notion that viewer's are physiologically aroused when they watch aggressive scenes. After watching an aggressive scene, an individual will become aggressive due to the arousal from the scene.

In 1974 Katz, Blumler, and Gurevitch used the uses and gratifications theory to explain media psychology. Katz, Blumler, and Gurevitch discovered five components of the theory; (1) the media competes with sources of satisfaction, (2) goals of mass media can be discovered through data and research, (3) media lies within the audience, (4) an audience is conceived as active, and (5) judgment of mass media should not be expressed until the audience has time to process the media and its content on their own. Katz, Blumler, and Gurevitch found out that audience gratification from the media are rooted in three things, the content of the media, the exposure to it, and the social context that represents different media exposure. However, most of all it comes from the desire to kill time in a way that is worthwhile. They also discovered that different forms of media satisfy in different ways; it fulfills different needs. For example, certain forms of media are used as an escape, like movies at the cinema, but the news channel may be not.

David Giles has been publishing in the area of media psychology since 2000. He wrote a book about media psychology in 2003. His book Media Psychology gives an overview of media psychology as a field, its subcategories, theories, and developmental issues within media psychology. Giles started his career as a music journalist, before attending the University of Manchester to study psychology. He then continued his studies at University of Bristol, where he obtained his PhD. Since then, Giles has published numerous books, chapters, articles, and delivered presentations on psychology and the media, with a focus on the influence of celebrities and media figures. He has also worked as a professor of psychology at many universities in England, including universities of Bolton, Sheffield Hallam, Coventry and Lancaster. Since 2009 Giles has been working in the position of reader at the University of Winchester.

Bernard Luskin is a licensed psychotherapist, with degrees in business and a UCLA doctorate in education, psychology and technology. He is also the founder and CEO of Luskin International. Luskin has been the founding president and CEO of many colleges and universities, including: Orange Coast College, Jones International University, Touro University Worldwide, Moorpark College, and Oxnard College. He has also had success as a writer, publishing titles such as Introduction to Economics: A Performance-Based Learning Guide in 1977 and Casting the Net over Global Learning: New Developments in Workforce and Online Psychologies in 2022.

== See also ==
- Cyberpsychology
- Media effects
- Mediatization
- Social media and psychology
