= Melman =

Melman or variant, may refer to:

== People ==
- Seymour Melman (1917–2004), American professor of industrial engineering and operations research
- Jeff Melman, American television producer and director
- Calvert DeForest, American actor whose stage name was "Larry 'Bud' Melman"
- Yossi Melman, (Hebrew: יוסי מלמן), Israeli writer and journalist
- Melvin "Mel-Man" Bradford, American record producer affiliated with Aftermath Entertainment
- Melvin "Mel-Man" Breeden, American record producer, CEO of Big Cat Records and Radar Live Music & Radar (E)Sports

== Fiction ==
- Melman (Madagascar), a fictional character from the Madagascar animated film series, A hypochondriac giraffe
- Roxanne Melman, a fictional character from the TV show L.A. Law

== See also ==
- Mailman
- Mehlman (western/original form)
- Milman (disambiguation)
- Millman
- Mel (disambiguation)
- Man (disambiguation)
