= Vishal Arya =

- Occupations: Technology executive, entrepreneur
- Organization: MatchBest Group
- Title: Chairman and Group Chief Executive Officer

Vishal Arya is an Indian-American technology executive and entrepreneur. He is the Chairman and Group Chief Executive Officer of MatchBest Group, an artificial intelligence and digital technology company headquartered in Palo Alto, California, USA.

Arya is known for building scalable artificial intelligence platforms, OTT ecosystems, and enterprise-grade digital infrastructures. He has contributed in cloud technologies, artificial intelligence, digital transformation and media technology platforms.

== Education ==
Vishal Arya holds a Bachelor's degree in Computer Engineering and an MBA in IT and Finance from Subharti University. He later completed an Executive MBA from the UCLA Anderson School of Management and an executive leadership program from the Wharton School of the University of Pennsylvania.

He has pursued a PhD in Generative Artificial Intelligence from Golden Gate University, focusing on advanced AI systems, automation, and enterprise intelligence.

== Career ==
=== MatchBest Group ===
Vishal Arya founded MatchBest Group in 2020. The company provides artificial intelligence, enterprise software, automation, cloud, cybersecurity, and healthcare technology related services. Under the MatchBest Group Arya founded Xelta Ai, a generative AI platform designed to transform creative intelligence.

Under his company, he has developed multiple platforms such as Xelta.ai, HealNova.ai, AvaSuite.ai (MatchBest Software), StreamPlay.ai, Vitaay.ai, and Elite Maverick. These platforms focus on enabling enterprise scalability, AI adoption, and operational efficiency.

=== Tata Play ===
Arya served as CTIO/CTO (Advisory) at Tata Play from 2020 to 2025, contributing to the company's digital transformation, OTT innovation, and technology strategy. During his tenure, he played a key role in the evolution and scaling of Tata Play Binge.

=== AT&T / DirecTV ===
Arya spent nearly two decades at AT&T and DirecTV, where he led large-scale engineering and technology initiatives supporting platforms serving over 20 million users globally.

His work included leadership in OTT systems, cloud infrastructure, artificial intelligence, and enterprise digital transformation. He also managed global engineering teams and oversaw technology investments exceeding $100 million.

== Awards and recognition ==
- Arya holds more than 16 U.S. patents across artificial intelligence, metadata systems, OTT architectures, and cloud infrastructure.
- Patent Achievement Award by AT&T for contributions to innovation and intellectual property
