= Richard Millman =

Richard Millman may refer to:

- Dick Millman, CEO of Bell Helicopter
- Richard Millman (historian), American historian
