= The Revelation (Little novel) =

Novel by Bentley Little

The Revelation is horror author Bentley Little's first published novel. It was awarded the Bram Stoker Award for best novel by a new author in 1990.

== Plot ==
The novel (as many of Little's works do) deals with a series of unexplained events in a small town in Arizona. A church is defaced with goat's blood, the pastor and his family disappear, and several townspeople begin having terrifying visions of deformed infants. Eventually, an unknown force begins to attack and murder several of the townspeople. Gordon, the main protagonist, discovers that his wife is pregnant and begins to fear for her safety and that of the unborn child. Soon, a seemingly unbalanced evangelical preacher named Brother Elias comes to the town to preach about the end times. Widely ignored at first, he gradually gains a following of people as more and more bizarre events unfold in the town. As the terror mounts, Elias convinces Gordon, the sheriff, and the new pastor to join him in his quest to stop Satan from raising an army of deformed infants. It seems that the devil has the power to corrupt the unborn into horrible servants of darkness, and over the centuries hundreds of these stillborn children have been buried in the hills surrounding the town. At this time, Elias also reveals he is not human, but an earthly servant of God whose role it is to stop Satan from assembling his army. He further explains that he has done this several times over the millennia. The four men face off against the incarnation of the devil, who has taken the form of the missing pastor. They succeed in stopping him, though Elias knows that the battle is never truly over and begins wandering away to make preparations for the next battle.
