= Bentley Little =

American author of horror fiction (born 1960)

- Born: 1960 (age 65–66); Mesa, Arizona, U.S.
- Education: California State University, Fullerton (BA, MA)
- Occupation: Novelist
- Writing career
- Pen name: Phillip Emmons
- Genre: Horror

Bentley Little (born 1960 in Mesa, Arizona) is an American author of horror fiction. Publishing an average of a novel a year since 1990, Little avoids publicity and rarely does promotional work or interviews for his writing.

== Early life ==
Little is an Arizona native who, according to his professional biography, was born one month after his mother saw the world premiere of Alfred Hitchcock's film Psycho. He studied at California State University Fullerton, from which he earned a BA in Communications and an MA in Comparative Literature. His thesis for the latter was his first novel, The Revelation, which was later published and won a Bram Stoker Award.

== Style and recognition ==
Little's novels tend to have brief titles (many use the construction "The [noun]", like The Mailman and The House) and fall squarely into the horror genre. He dislikes his work being categorized as "suspense" or "supernatural thriller", preferring the more straightforward genre label. His work has been championed by Stephen King and Dean Koontz, leading to increased recognition.

== Adaptations ==
In 2007 Little's short story "The Washingtonians" was adapted for the TV show Masters of Horror, becoming the twelfth episode of its second season. Directed by Peter Medak, it significantly lightened the tone of the author's original work, aiming for camp over the short story's dark humour. It was negatively received by critics.

That same year The Hollywood Reporter announced that a film adaptation of the novel The Store was in development at Strike Entertainment, with a script by Jenna McGrath, production duties handled by Marc Abraham and Eric Newman, and executive production by Vince Gerardis, Eli Kirschner, and Tom Bliss. As of 2025 the project has not yet come to fruition.

On November 18, 2021, it was revealed that a TV series based on Little's novel The Consultant has been ordered by Amazon Prime Video.

== Bibliography ==
=== Novels ===
- The Revelation (1990)
- The Mailman (1991)
- Death Instinct (1992) (writing as Phillip Emmons), also known as Evil Deeds
- The Summoning (1993)
- Night School (1994) – released as University in 1995
- Dominion (1996)
- The Ignored (1997)
- Guests (1997) – released in the U.S. as The Town in 2000
- The Store (1998)
- The House (1999)
- The Walking (2000)
- The Town (2000) – updated re-release of Guests (1999, UK)
- The Association (2001)
- The Return (2002)
- The Policy (2003)
- The Resort (2004)
- Dispatch (2005)
- The Burning (2006)
- The Vanishing (2007)
- The Academy (2008)
- His Father's Son (2009)
- The Disappearance (2010)
- The Haunted (2012)
- The Circle (2012)
- The Influence (2013)
- The Consultant (2016)
- The Handyman (2017)
- The Bank (2020)
- Gloria (2021)
- DMV (2023)
- Behind (2024)
- City Hall (2025)

=== Collections ===
- Murmurous Haunts (1997)
- The Collection (2002)
- Four Dark Nights (2002) (with Douglas Clegg, Christopher Golden, and Tom Piccirilli)
- Indignities of the Flesh (2012)
- Walking Alone: Short Stories (2018)

=== Short stories ===
- Witch Woman (1985)
- The Show (1987)
- Looney Tune (1987)
- The Janitor (1988)
- The Sanctuary (1989)
- Miles to Go Before I Sleep (1991)
- The Potato (1991)
- The Washingtonians (1992)
- The Man in the Passenger Seat (1993)
- Monteith (1993)
- From the Mouths of Babes (1994)
- The Numbers Game (1994)
- The Pond (1994)
- See Marilyn Monroe's Panties! (1995)
- Life With Father (1998)
- Connie (1999)
- The Theatre (1999)
- After the Date (2005)
- Pop Star in The Ugly Bar (2005)
- Brushing (2007)
- The Miracle (2012)

=== Awards ===
- 1990 Bram Stoker Award winner for Best First Novel (The Revelation)
- 1993 Bram Stoker Award nominee for Best Novel (The Summoning)
- 2012 Bram Stoker Award nominee for Best Novel (The Haunted)
