= Sillman =

Sillman is a surname. Notable people with the surname include:

- Amy Sillman (born 1955), American painter
- Leonard Sillman (1908–1982), American theatre producer
- Norman Sillman (1921–2013), English sculptor and coin designer
- Teodor Sillman (1854–1926), Finnish politician
