= Jennings Bryant =

American professor (1944–2020)

- Born: July 21, 1944
- Died: October 14, 2020 (aged 76)

Academic background
- Education: Davidson College (BA); Louisville Presbyterian Theological Seminary; Indiana University Bloomington (PhD)

Academic work
- Discipline: Child psychology

Jennings Bryant (July 21, 1944 – October 14, 2020) was Distinguished Professor Emeritus at The University of Alabama. Prior to his retirement in 2010, he was Communication and Information Sciences Distinguished Research Professor, holder of the Reagan Endowed Chair of Broadcasting, and Associate Dean for Graduate Studies and Research at UA. Jennings Bryant was married to Sara Poteat Bryant for 43 years. He and Sara were the parents of three children. The Bryants lived on a family farm in the Mountain Valley Rural Agricultural Historical District in Glenwood, North Carolina.

Over the course of his career, Bryant made major contributions to the field of mass communication, primarily in the area of media effects research.

== Education ==
Bryant received a bachelor's degree in history from Davidson College in 1967. He completed his Master's of Divinity work in Communication and Counseling in 1971, graduating from Louisville Presbyterian Theological Seminary with highest honors. Bryant earned a Ph.D. in Mass Communication from Indiana University Bloomington in 1974, again graduating with highest honors.

== Research ==
Bryant's research work has been vast, but much of it has focused on media effects research, particularly as it relates to media use and children. He is responsible for two landmark works: his 1983 book, co-edited with psychologist Dan Anderson, Children's Understanding of Television: Research on Attention and Comprehension "Children's Understanding of Television: Research on Attention and Comprehension" remains one of the most-cited works on the subject of media effects on children, and his 2002 textbook Media Effects: Advances in Theory and Research "Media Effects: Advances in Theory and Research", co-edited with Dolf Zillmann, which is one of the most widely used textbooks in Mass Communication theory courses worldwide.

One of the more widely cited articles Bryant helped author was a large research project on the effects of exposure to the television show "Blue's Clues" on television viewing behavior and cognitive development of children. This, largely correlational, study—which simply used a battery of tests that they repeatedly gave the children every few months, and used the elevated post-test results to suggest that their television viewing or Blue's Clues had a positive impact on cognitive development in children, with children who viewed the show showing more successful and systematic problem-solving increased cognitive skills than those who did not. The study did not account for or control for practice, age related cognitive changes, or the Hawthorne effect. Children, their teachers and caregivers were coaxed to put in extra effort because of the monetary incentives they received.

Bryant has also been published in other areas of effects research, including Cultivation theory with co-author Dorina Miron, pornography, and video games.

== Publications ==
Bryant has authored, co-authored, or edited 27 books, 77 chapters, 20 scholarly encyclopedia entries, and 78 articles in peer-reviewed journals, as well as 129 technical reports totaling over 8,000 pages.

Bryant was also the Advisory Editor of the 12-volume, 5,694 page International Encyclopedia of Communication, which was published by Wiley-Blackwell in 2008 and is updated quarterly. The Encyclopedia is a reference guide for all theoretical research conducted in the modern age of Communication Studies.

== Contributions to the field through service ==
Bryant served as a member of the editorial board of 23 peer-reviewed journals between 1978 and present day, including as Founding Co-Editor of the journal Media Psychology, which most recently earned an impact score of 0.618 from SJR, making it the 26th-ranked Applied Psychology (2nd quartile) journal and 26th-ranked Communication (1st quartile) journal currently in print. In that time, he reviewed more than 25 journal manuscripts each year.

Additionally, Bryant served as a reviewer for work done on behalf of 26 outside foundations, including the National Science Foundation, National Endowment for the Arts, the Netherlands Royal Academy for Sciences, the Guggenheim Foundation, and the Kellogg Foundation.

Bryant also served as an outside reviewer for tenure and/or promotion for 127 colleges and universities domestically and internationally, in departments such as Psychology, Human Development, Education, Library and Information Studies, Marketing, and Communication. In this role, he was responsible for determining the qualifications of persons seeking tenure or promotion within the field.

== Sesame Street and other children's programming ==
Bryant was a Spencer Foundation Fellow in Formative Evaluation for Children's Television Workshop in New York in 1972 where he worked on research underpinning the creation of new segments and formats for Sesame Street and The Electric Company. He also contributed writing to several other children's television shows between 1970 and 1980 and created (and later sold) two companies dedicated to the creation of, and consulting for, television programming for children. He has also been a paid consultant for over 60 major media companies, many of them dealing with children's programming and media effects.

== Awards and recognition ==
Bryant has received 67 awards or official recognitions in his career for his contributions to research, service, teaching, and community, including 28 Top-Rated or prize winning conference paper presentations, several Distinguished or Outstanding teacher awards, multiple Fellowships, and over $3,300,000 worth of research grant funding.

A brief list of some of the more prestigious honors:

- Outstanding Teacher Award, Large Lecture Courses ("Johnny Carson Award"), University of Massachusetts—Amherst, 1980
- Alumni Association Outstanding Teaching Award, University of Evansville, 1984
- Knox Hagood Award, Outstanding Faculty Member, College of Communication, University of Alabama, 1990
- Alabama Citizen of the Year, Alabama-Mississippi Telephone Association, 1993
- Faculty Fellow, Blackburn Leadership Institute, University of Alabama, 1997
- Frederick Moody Blackmon-Sarah McCorkle Moody Outstanding Professor Award, University of Alabama, 2000
- President, International Communication Association, 2002–2003
- Fellow, International Communication Association, 2006
- Distinguished Scholar Award, Broadcast Education Association, 2006
- John F. Burnum Distinguished Professor Award, The University of Alabama, 2008
- Doctor of Humane Letters honoris causa, Davidson College, May 20, 2018
