= Affective disposition theory =

Affective disposition theory (ADT) states that media and entertainment users make moral judgments about characters in a narrative which in turn affects their enjoyment of the narrative. This theory was first posited by Dolf Zillmann and Joanne Cantor in the 1977 article "Affective Responses to the Emotions of a Protagonist," and many offshoots have followed in various areas of entertainment (Raney, 2006a). Entertainment users make constant judgments of a character's actions, and these judgments enable the user to determine which character they believe is the "good guy" or the "villain". However, in the article "Expanding Disposition Theory: Reconsidering Character Liking, Moral Evaluations, and Enjoyment," Arthur Raney examined the fundamental assumption of ADT that viewers of drama always form their dispositions toward characters through moral judgments of the characters' motives and conduct. Raney argued that viewers/consumers of entertainment media could form positive dispositions toward characters before any moral scrutinizing occurs. He proposed that viewers sometimes develop story schemas that provide them "with the cognitive pegs upon which to hang their initial interpretations and expectations of characters". The basic idea of the affective disposition theory is used as a way to explain how emotions become part of the entertainment experience.

== Theory history and application ==
ADT's premise is that entertainment users attach emotions to various characters within a narrative, but this has been expanded to comedy, drama, tragedy, violence, and sports. Although some theorists argue that the theories used to explore different forms of entertainment media encompass the same general processes, some evidence exists that disposition formation may differ across content. For example, Sapolsky found that viewer race rather than the previously mentioned morality was an accurate predictor of team favorability in an all-White versus all-Black basketball game. In antihero narratives, researchers such as Sapolsky have suggested that the formation process of dispositions may differ from the usual affective disposition theory formula. ADT is closely related to misattribution theory of humor. Disposition theory takes the position that entertainment users are just an audience, they are not active. By employing this perspective, the audience does not experience real emotion towards the events in the narrative, but rather experience suspense instead. The creator of a narrative can apply the steps of the disposition model to heighten the experience of that narrative. If the reader likes a character, they will hope for a positive outcome. If they dislike a character, they will hope that character fails, creating a counter-empathy. By delaying this outcome, the writer can create suspense in the viewer. This suspense heightens emotional arousal and, therefore, the enjoyment of the narrative.

In "The Psychology of Disposition-Based Theories of Media and Enjoyment," Raney offers six principles that are shared amongst all applications of disposition theory:

1. "Disposition-based theories are concerned with the enjoyment or appreciation of media content." (pg. 144)
2. "Disposition-based theories are concerned with emotional responses to media content." (pg. 145)
3. "Disposition-based theories contend that media enjoyment starts with and is driven by the viewer's feelings about the character." (pg. 145)
4. "Disposition-based theories contend that affiliations towards characters are formed and maintained on a continuum from extreme positive through indifference to extreme negative affect." (pg. 146)
5. "Because disposition-based theories rely upon the evaluation of conflict outcomes between characters, justice consideration are a necessary component of the theories." (pg. 147)
6. "Disposition-based theories further acknowledge and rely upon the differences between individuals in terms of emotional responsiveness, personal experiences, basal morality, and countless other psychological and social-psychological factors." (pg. 147)

Using these six principles, one can surmise that creating a strong and opposing disposition for the characters in the story will lead to greater enjoyment for the viewer. By making a villain's actions terribly amoral, and the hero's actions extremely moral, one can create emotional arousal in a viewer.

== Cognitive development aspects ==
There are several scholars that have studied disposition theory in relation to the cognitive aspects of learning and development. Siegel, Dewey, and Baron are a few prominent scholars who studied how disposition theory relates to intelligence.

These theorists have taken a more broad approach with respect to affective disposition theory, and this standpoint most likely helped to widen their basis for research on human thought. They have looked at the way our thoughts work through the lens of abilities and dispositions. Dispositions are related to our choices in behavior. Theorists like Siegel have tried to understand and explain why we as humans do things in certain ways.

Many theorists have discussed abilities in relation to disposition, and Baron has studied this link as well as the connection between disposition and the process of thinking. There are certain elements of thinking and reactions that come into play here. Sensitivity is one of the most prominent of these.

There are seven different types of disposition that have been discussed in relation to cognitive development, e.g. the disposition to be broad and adventurous.

== Model of forming dispositions ==
Zillmann's model for the formation of dispositions explains the relationship between the behavior of characters and the audience's approval of the story. This model outlines the steps the viewer goes through to create a disposition:

1. Perception and Assessment: The viewer observes an action.
2. Moral Judgment of the Character: The viewer determines whether that action was appropriate and moral or not.
3. Affective Disposition: An affect, positive or negative depending on the moral judgment made before, is formed.
4. Anticipation and Apprehension: The viewer determines what outcome they would like to see depending on how they view the character's morality.
5. Perception and Assessment: The outcome is seen.
6. Response to Outcome/Emotion: The viewer decides how they feel about the outcome, and in turn, how they feel about the story and characters.
7. Moral Judgment: The viewer determines whether they approve of the outcome.

== Sports media ==
The concepts of the traditional affective disposition theory have been applied to sports media consumption by considering the fact that enjoyment could be conceived as the emotional response to consuming media surrounding players or teams. The exploration of enjoyment of sport spectatorship is very complex and must take into account fan socialization and disposition formation. Research on fan socialization investigates how people are originally socialized as sports fans, and also examines the reasons why people form allegiances towards specific teams. Raney (2006b) states that these allegiances and types of socializations are at the core of the entertainment motivation for viewing sports media.

The specific version of the disposition theory that is used in sport media viewing (Disposition Theory of Sport Spectatorship) applies the basic ideas of the disposition theory to sports content. The basic premise that is used to cross over into the world of sport is that enjoyment of entertainment is primarily a reflection of both the consumers' feelings toward the players or teams and the outcomes (Zillmann, 1991, 2000; Zillmann & Cantor, 1977; Raney, 2004a, 2004b; Raney, 2006b; Peterson & Raney, 2008). Raney also found that the expectation of experiencing enjoyment is the greatest reason that sports media viewers report why they consume sports media.

According to academic researchers and theorist (Bryant & Raney, 2000; Zillman, Bryant & Sapolsky, 1989; Zillman & Paulus, 1993), the Disposition Theory of Sports Spectatorship states that a viewer's affiliation or allegiance to a particular team or player must be discussed along a continuum. This continuum ranges from extremely positive through indifference to extremely negative. Raney (2006b) posits that the enjoyment of viewing a sporting event comes as a by-product of a combination of the outcome of the game, and the viewers strength and valence of dispositions held toward the competitors. Exposure to the competitors over time allows individuals to develop these dispositions of varying valence and degree toward teams and athletes. In more simplistic terms, the enjoyment of the spectator or viewer has been found to increase the more the winning team is favored by the spectator/viewer and the more the losing team is disliked by the spectator/viewer. Henceforth, the maximum enjoyment of the spectator comes when the intensely liked team or player defeats the intensely disliked team or player.

Additionally, research indicates that sports fanship in general is important to enjoyment of sports media. Specifically, Gantz & Wenner (1991, 1995) found that the selective exposure to media and motivations for viewing sports media literatures indicate that fanship in relation to the particular sport also impacts perceptions about the contest. Therefore, the argument can be made that this level of dispositional affiliation toward the sport might also impact perceived suspense and enjoyment.

Raney and Depalma (2006) also noted that the knowledge of whether sports are scripted or unscripted changed viewers' enjoyment of the sports. For unscripted sports, the uncertainty of the outcome, rivalry strength, the implications of specific games to overall team rankings, and similar factors affect the suspense and viewer enjoyment.
