= Humor theory =

Humor theory may refer to:

- Humorism, an old medical theory that there are four body fluids called "humors"
- Theories of humor, theories explaining humor
