= Lapland New Forest =

Defunct theme park in Hampshire, England

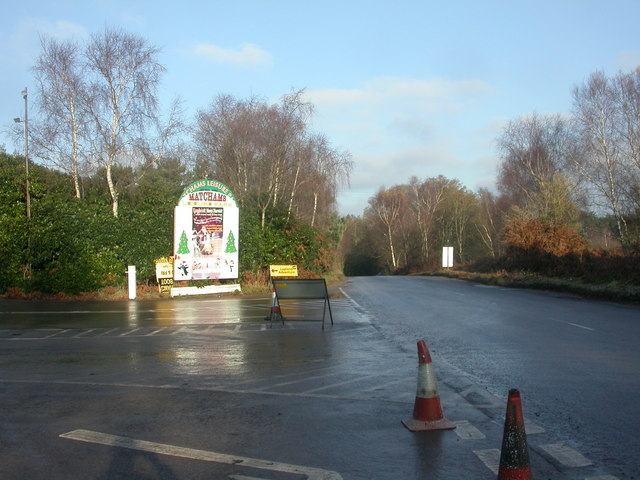
- Sign for Lapland New Forest in December 2008
- Interactive map of Lapland New Forest
- Coordinates: 50.808°N 1.817°W
- Status: Defunct
- Opened: November 28, 2008
- Closed: December 4, 2008
- Theme: Christmas
- Slogan: ...Where dreams really do come true!
- Operating season: November to December

Lapland New Forest (Note: Lapland is a region in Finland, which in the United Kingdom is popularly associated with Christmas.) was a short-lived winter wonderland theme park near Ringwood, Hampshire, UK, in 2008. The park had been advertised as being a "winter wonderland" with a variety of exciting family events such as a Christmas market and a "magical tunnel of light", but the majority of the promised attractions either malfunctioned or were of a very low quality. The park closed after a week following complaints from customers and poor press attention, and the organisers were charged with misleading advertising and sentenced to 13 months in prison.

The park's disastrous operation gained national news attention in the UK and has since been compared to similar ill-fated events such as Willy's Chocolate Experience.

== Venue ==
The home webpage of Lapland New Forest prior to opening

Upon opening on 28 November 2008, the park received a great deal of criticism in the United Kingdom due to the extremely poor quality of its attractions; the nativity scene was a crudely painted billboard that could be seen across a muddy field, the "magical tunnel of light" was a line of trees with fairy lights dangling from them, the ice rink had melted due to a faulty generator, the "log cabins" were empty garden sheds, the Christmas market consisted of only four stalls and required an extra fee to enter, husky dogs and reindeer were mistreated and tethered in muddy conditions, and Santa's grotto was a poorly decorated cabin.

50,000 tickets were sold in advance, with ticket prices beginning at £25. Over £1.2 million had been made in total.

== Customer response ==
Children who had looked forward to the event were reduced to tears, especially when the actor playing Santa was caught smoking.

Violence flared up between visitors and workers. A mother who was upset about the event slapped and berated an elf, and two fathers brawled in the gingerbread house. A furious father punched Santa in the face after being told his children were not allowed to sit on Santa's lap despite waiting in a four-hour-long line. One worker in a snowman costume received so much verbal abuse that he eventually walked off in full costume.

== Closure and convictions ==
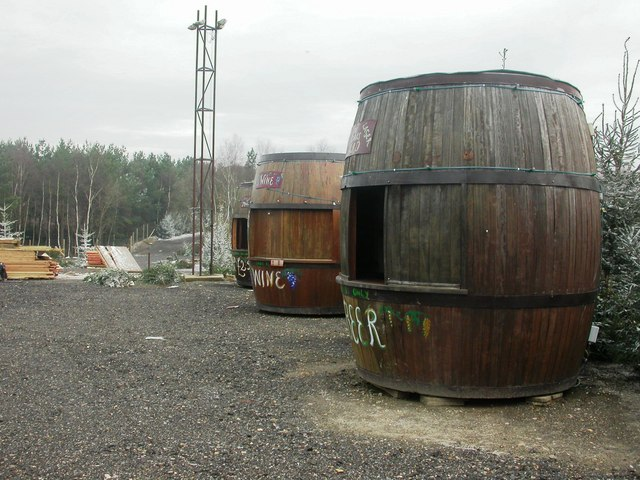
Drinks stalls at the abandoned park site, in March 2009

Lapland New Forest was closed within days of having opened.

In February 2011, Victor and Henry Mears, the brothers who ran the park, were found guilty of eight charges of misleading the public, and were jailed for 13 months each in March 2011.

In October 2011, the pair had their convictions overturned by the Court of Appeal following revelations that one of the jurors had been receiving texts from her fiancé during the trial. The fiancé had been present in court and the text messages (one of which simply read "guilty") had been seen by other jurors. The Court of Appeal's view was that this made the convictions unsafe. Dorset County Council, which had brought the original prosecution, subsequently indicated that it would not be seeking a retrial as the brothers had already served prison sentences.

== See also ==
- Willy's Chocolate Experience
