= Donald Dutton =

Canadian psychologist

Donald G. Dutton
- Born: October 9, 1943 (age 83); Canada

Academic background
- Education: University of Toronto (PhD, 1970)

Academic work
- Discipline: Psychology
- Sub-discipline: Social psychology, Intimate partner violence
- Institutions: University of British Columbia

Donald George Dutton (born October 9, 1943) is a Canadian psychologist who is known for his work on traumatic bonding and misattribution of arousal. He is an expert on forensic psychology who has served as an expert witness in legal cases, including in the prosecution of O. J. Simpson.

He received his Ph.D. in social psychology from the University of Toronto in 1970, and is currently Professor Emeritus in the Department of Psychology at the University of British Columbia.

== Career ==
Dutton's research interests include the psychology of violence, social science epistemology, criminal justice, social psychological explanations for clinical syndromes, and personality disorders.

In a famous experiment on misattribution of arousal, Dutton and Arthur Aron found that subjects were more sexually attracted to an experimenter when crossing a rickety bridge.

Along with his co-author Susan Painter, Dutton coined the term "traumatic bonding", referring to emotional attachments which "develop from two specific features of abusive relationships: power imbalances and intermittent good-bad treatment".

Dutton is known for his research on intimate partner violence and the psychology of abusive behavior. In 1979, he co-founded the Assaultive Husbands Project, a court-mandated treatment program for men convicted of spousal assault in Vancouver. Dutton has been outspoken about the reality of domestic violence, that despite stereotypes it is actually perpetrated by both men and women.

In 1999, the British Columbia Human Rights Tribunal found Dutton responsible for sexual harassment towards a student of his in the Department of Psychology at the University of British Columbia. The tribunal found that Dutton created a "sexualized environment" while meeting with the student at his home, although the tribunal also found the student lied. There was no evidence of any sexual contact taking place; however, the tribunal disapproved of certain aspects of a dinner meeting, such as a comment made by Dutton to the student that he missed physical contact with his wife. Dutton has maintained that he did nothing wrong.

== Books ==
Dutton has authored or co-authored several books on domestic violence, including The Batterer: A Psychological Profile (1995, with Susan Golant), The Abusive Personality: Violence and Control in Intimate Relationships (1998), and Rethinking Domestic Violence (2006). The Batterer has been translated into French, Spanish, Dutch, Japanese, and Polish.

The second edition of The Abusive Personality (2007) received positive reviews in academic journals. A review in the Journal of Family Therapy described it as providing "a clear, concise, authoritative and inspiring account of the empirical, theoretical and treatment literatures on relationship abusiveness." The Canadian Journal of Psychiatry reviewed the work, as did the academic journal Choice.
