= Milman =

Milman may refer to:

== People with the surname ==
- Adolf Milman (1886–1930), Russian and French painter
- David Milman (1912–1982), mathematician
- Dov Milman (1919–2007), Israeli politician and diplomat
- Sir Francis Milman, 1st Baronet (1746–1821), British physician
- Henry Hart Milman (1791–1868), English historian, son of Francis
- Mark Milman (1910–1995), Soviet pianist and composer
- Pierre Milman, mathematician
- Sophie Milman (born 1983), jazz vocalist
- Vitali Milman (born 1939), mathematician

== Places ==
- Milman, Iran
- Milman, Queensland, Australia
- Milman Islet, an island off the coast of Queensland, Australia

== Other uses ==
- Milman baronets, a British title

== See also ==
- Krein–Milman theorem
- Millman
