= Mehlman =

Mehlman is a surname. Notable people with the surname include:

- Jeffrey Mehlman, literary critic and historian of ideas
- Ken Mehlman, chair of the US Republican National Committee
- Peter Mehlman, television writer and producer

== See also ==
- Melman (disambiguation)
