= Hyde Park Winter Wonderland =

Annual Christmas event in London, England

Coordinates: 51°30′28.15″N 0°9′28.08″W

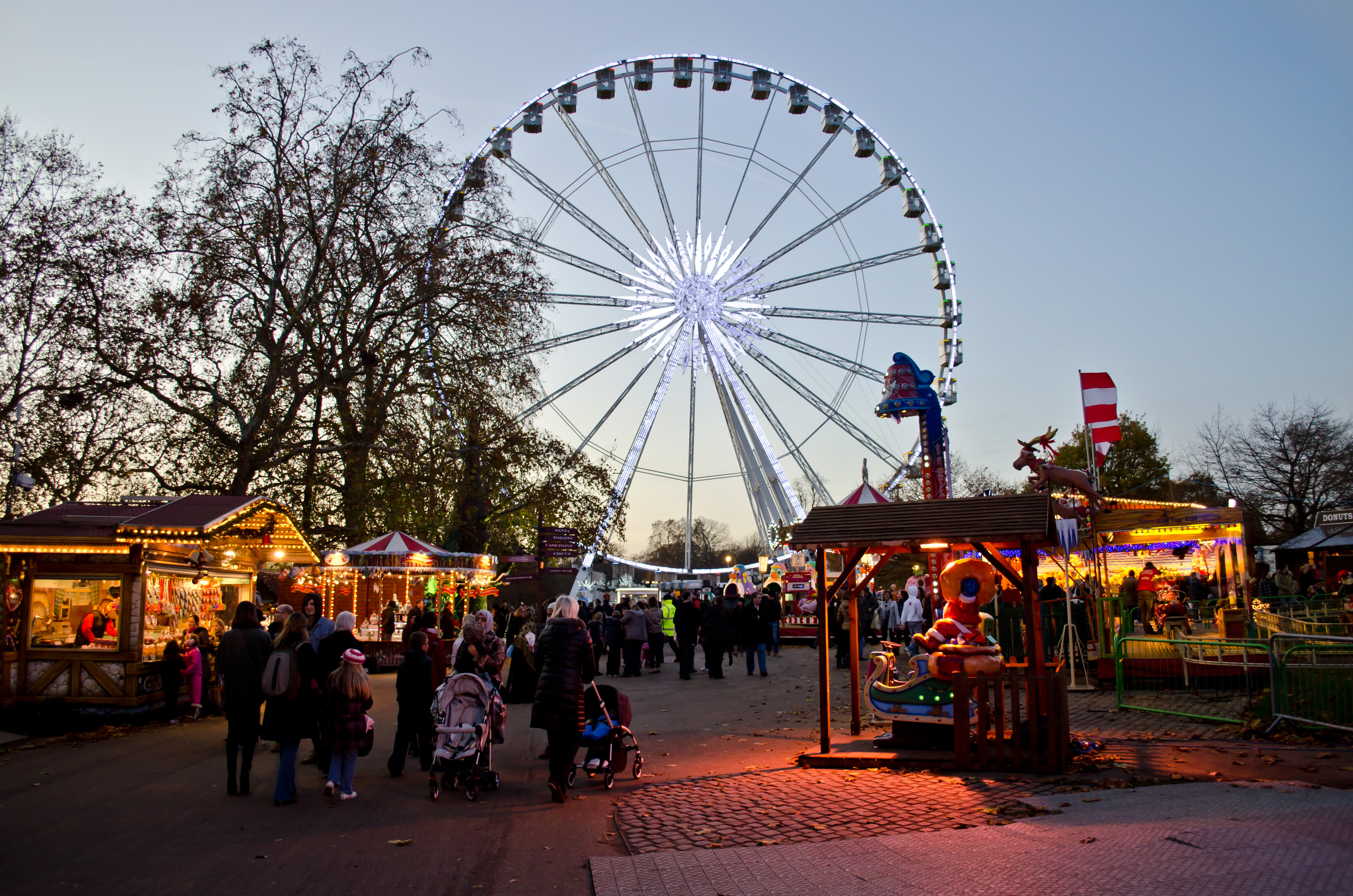
- The Winter Wonderland in 2011
- Status: Active
- Frequency: Annually
- Venue: Hyde Park, London
- Locations: London, United Kingdom
- Inaugurated: 11 December 2007
- Founder: PWR Events; Royal Parks of London
- Attendance: 2.5 million
- Organiser: MARI
- Website: Official website

Hyde Park Winter Wonderland, commonly referred to simply as Winter Wonderland, is a large annual Christmas winter wonderland fair held in Hyde Park, London, from mid-November to early January. It features several festive markets, over 100 rides and attractions from across Europe, a Giant Wheel, numerous live shows, including a circus, ice show, and live music, as well as numerous bars and restaurants. In its first ten years, Winter Wonderland had 14 million visitors.

== History ==
Logo used until 2025

Winter Wonderland began in 2005 as a small funfair operating through the Christmas period at the edge of Hyde Park. The lack of success led The Royal Parks to look at alternative events. In 2007, The Royal Parks invited AEG Live and PWR Events to co-operate on organising the new Winter Wonderland event. The event includes a Christmas Market, a temporary Ice Rink, a Giant Wheel, and a small selection of amusement rides along Serpentine Road in Hyde Park.

From 2009 to 2010, the event grew substantially, introducing the Bavarian Village (a German style food and drink centre), Zippo's Circus, Santa Land (an area with smaller rides for children and families), and the introduction of several larger rides, such as the Power Tower 2 freefall tower.

In 2012, the event was granted an expansion of the site. The following attractions were introduced: Wilde Maus XXL roller coaster; Magical Ice Kingdom (a walk-through exhibition of ice sculptures). The Bavarian Village expanded to include The Great Hall, an Oktoberfest style beer tent with live music.

In 2016, the attractions Munich Looping, the world's largest portable roller coaster; and the Imperial Ice Stars ice show were introduced.

In 2018, the following attractions were introduced: Dr Archibald – Master of Time dark ride, the Winter Wonderland Comedy Club, The Snowman Experience, and the Teletubbies Christmas Show.

On 2 September 2020, PWR Events announced that due to the COVID-19 pandemic, the event was cancelled; however, it returned on 19 November 2021.

In 2025, ownership of Hyde Park Winter Wonderland was transferred from PWR Events to MARI, after MARI acquired PWR Events.

== Attractions ==
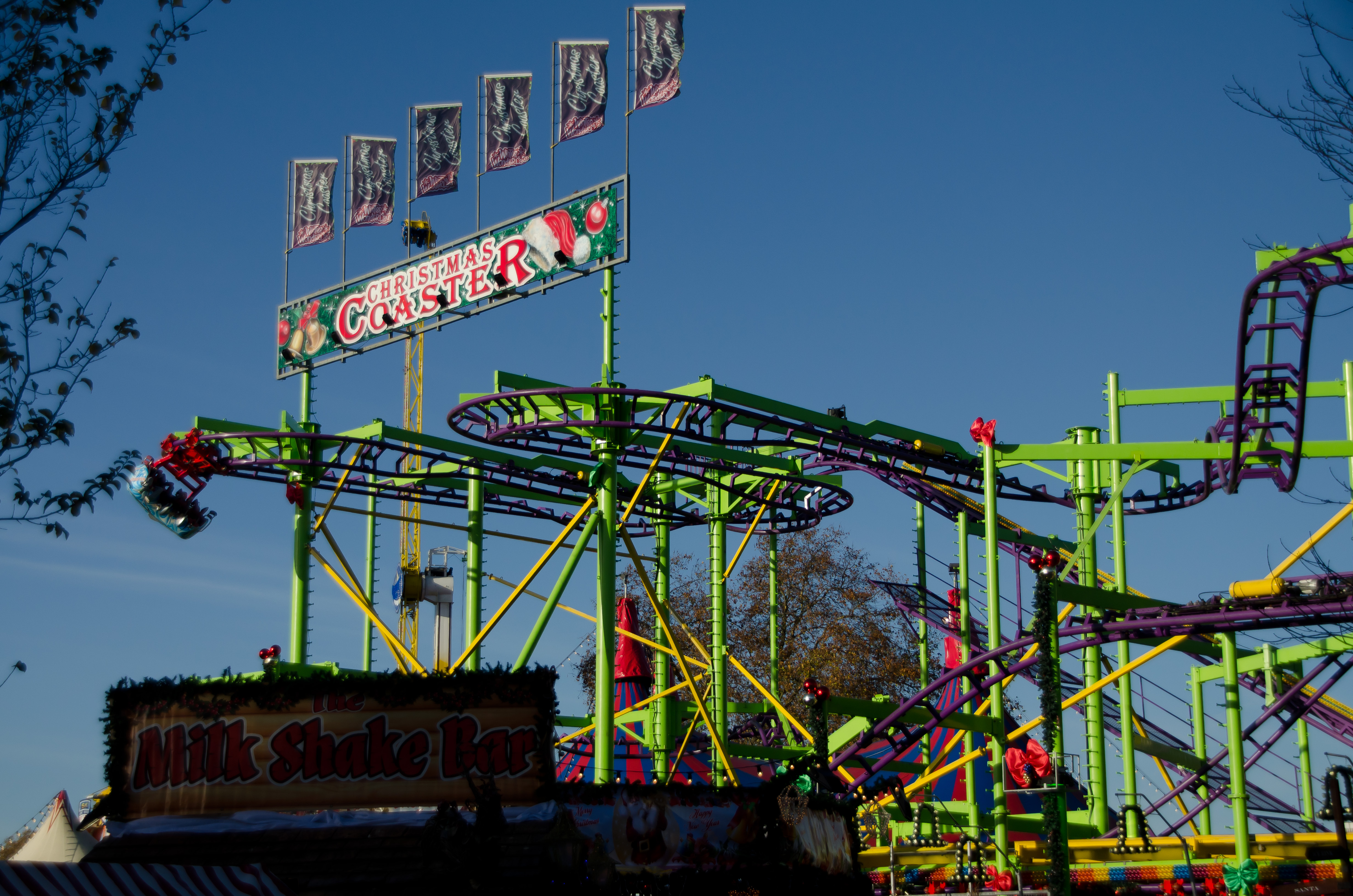
The "Christmas Coaster", 2011

- Ice Rink – The UK's largest temporary outdoor ice rink, set around the park's permanent bandstand, often featuring live music.
- Magical Ice Kingdom – an indoor walk-through exhibition of ice sculptures, and interactive exhibits e.g. ice slide.
- Bavarian Village – Large German-themed food and drink village, featuring numerous bars and eateries, and live music.
- Carousel Bar – Rotating bar, themed to resemble a traditional Gallopers/Carousel ride.
- Christmas Markets – Numerous markets around the site, selling food, drink, and gifts.
- Santa Land – Children's area, featuring smaller rides, and Santa's Grotto.
- Zippo's Mega Dome – Circus tent featuring three shows: The Mr. Men Christmas Show, Zippo's Christmas Circus (afternoons), and Cirque Berserk (evenings).

=== Rides ===
- Giant Wheel – A 60-metre Ferris Wheel.
- Dr Archibald – Master of Time – A large dark ride, in which riders wear virtual reality headsets and board a time machine to explore a series of fantasy worlds.
- Munich Looping – The world's largest portable roller coaster, featuring five vertical loops.
- Wilde Maus XXL (AKA Xmas Maus) – The world's largest portable Wild Mouse roller coaster, and the first portable roller coaster to offer a Virtual Reality option.
- Ice Mountain – A Wild Mouse style roller coaster with spinning cars, enclosed within a specially designed building.
- North Pole Star Flyer – A 70-metre tall Star Flyer ride.
- Hangover – An 85-metre freefall tower ride.
- XXL – A 40-metre tall swing ride with spinning gondola.
- Eurocoaster- A regular roller coaster With seats under the rail.
- Slingshot - an illuminated Reverse bungee under various names each year.

== Incidents ==
On 24 November 2019, a professional acrobatic performer for Zippos Circus fell a reported 30ft after she slipped from her safety harness. It was later disputed by circus management that she had only fallen 12ft.

On 20 December 2021, a power cut caused the Munich Looping to come to a halt on the first hill, with riders having to exit the rollercoaster by walking down the trusses. No injuries were reported, although this specific ride was involved in the fatality of an employee while stationed at Vienna's Prater amusement park. The fatality was later deemed to be caused by the employee entering a restricted area.

In the evening of the 11 December, 2022, a man was stabbed in the neck entering the premises, he was treated at hospital with non-life threatening injuries.

On 15 December 2022, an incident occurred on the Slingshot ride. After a failure with the gearbox, the bungee cord appeared to fall loose, sending the passenger car into the support beam, there were no reported injuries.
