= Milman, Iran =

Milman ميل مان
- Village
- Location within Iran
- Coordinates: 28°39′21″N 60°52′21″E
- Country: Iran
- Province: Sistan and Baluchestan
- County: Khash
- Bakhsh: Nukabad
- Rural District: Eskelabad

Population (2006)
  - Total: 27
- Time zone: UTC+3:30 (IRST)
  - Summer (DST): UTC+4:30 (IRDT)

Milman (Persian: ميل مان, also Romanized as Mīlmān) is a village in Eskelabad Rural District, Nukabad District, Khash County, Sistan and Baluchestan Province, Iran. At the 2006 census, its population was 27, in 12 families.
