= Teodor Sillman =

Finnish politician

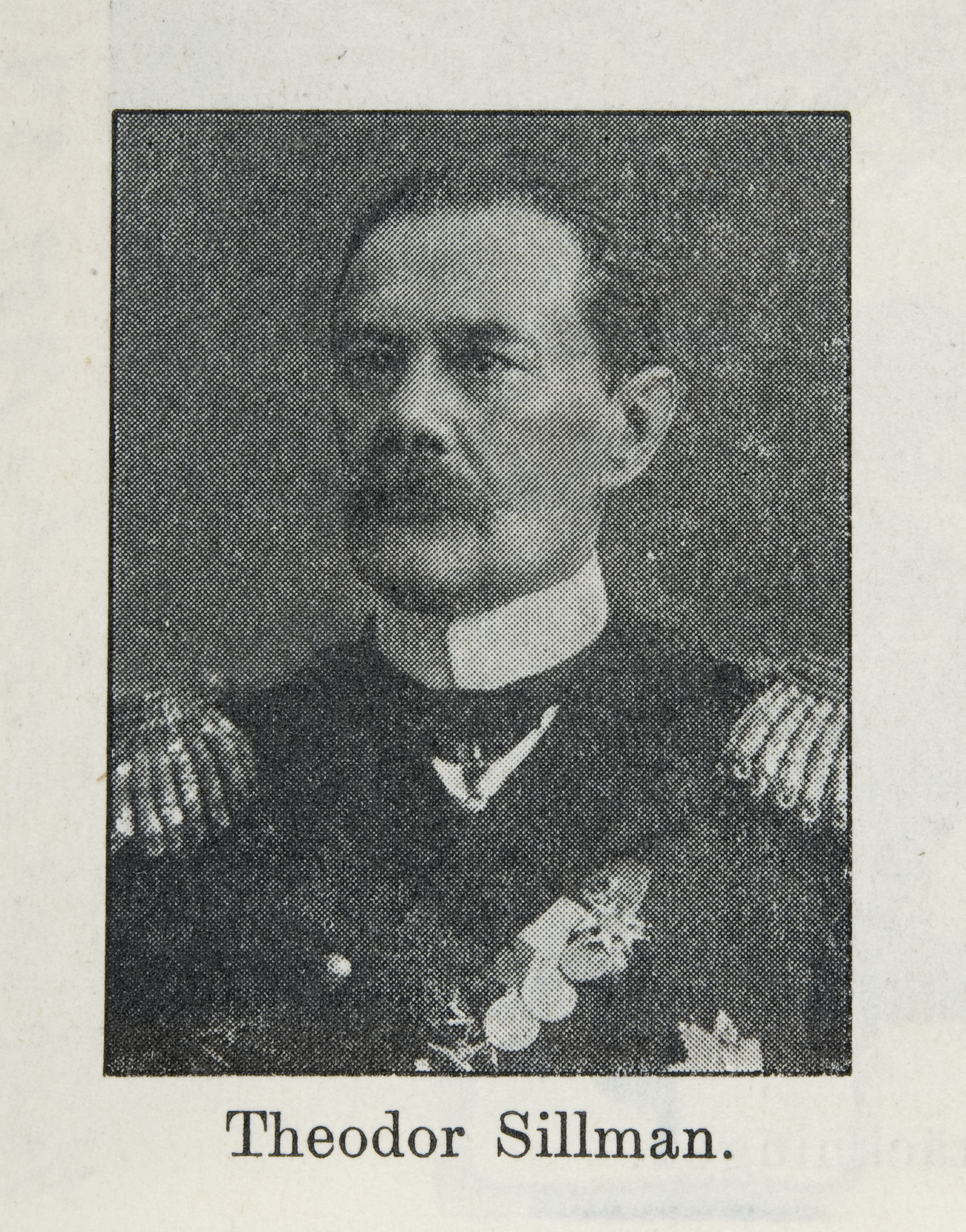
Teodor Sillman

Teodor Sillman (Russian: Фёдор Си́льман; 17 January 1854 in Helsinki – 12 March 1926 in Gatchina, St. Petersburg) was a Finnish politician. He was a member of the Senate of Finland. He was also an officer of the Imperial Russian Navy, and he fought in the Boxer Rebellion in China.
