= Dolf Zillmann =

American psychologist specialising in media psychology

Dean Emeritus, Professor Dolf Zillmann
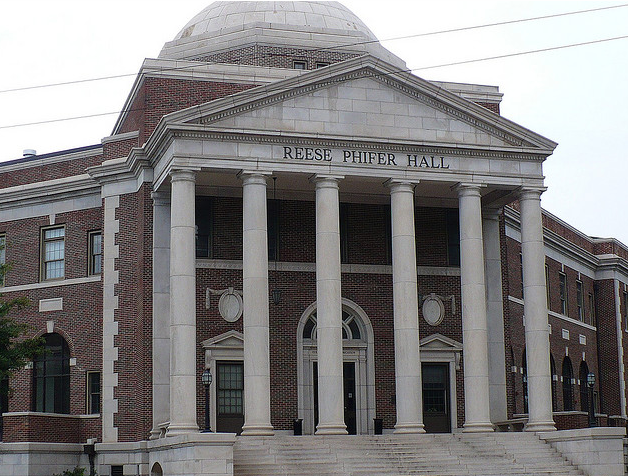
- Reese Phifer Building at the University of Alabama
- Born: March 12, 1935 (age 91); Meseritz, Poland
- Occupation: Psychologist
- Spouse: Valtra Zillmann
- Children: Martin Zillmann, Tomas Zillmann

Academic background
- Education: Ulm School of Design, University of Wisconsin-Madison, University of Pennsylvania

Academic work
- Discipline: Psychology, Communication
- Sub-discipline: Media Psychology
- Institutions: University of Pennsylvania, Indiana University, University of Alabama

Dolf Zillmann (born March 12, 1935) is dean emeritus, and professor of information sciences, communication and psychology at the University of Alabama (UA). Zillmann predominantly conducted research in media psychology, a branch of psychology focused on the effects of media consumption on human affect, developing and expanding a range of theories within media psychology and communication. His work centred on the relation between aggression, emotion, and arousal through media consumption, predominantly in pornography and violent genres of movie and television. His research also includes the effects of music consumption, video games, and sports.

Zillmann's influence within both the fields of media psychology and communication was highlighted by Ellen Baker Derwin and Janet De Merode finding Zillmann to be the seventh most contributing media psychology author between 1999 and 2010.

== Life ==
=== Early life and education (1935–1959) ===
Born in the former Province of Brandenburg, in the now Polish town of Meseritz, Zillmann's birthplace was highly contended, changing hands between German, Polish and Soviet forces throughout the duration of the Second World War. Much of his early educational experiences in the Western region of Poland took place in underfunded and understaffed educational institutions. Within Poland, roughly 20 percent of the population over the age of 10 were illiterate. Many of the primary schools had been closed, instead being utilised as hospitals for soldiers. Those schools that were open were highly filtered and structured through the Nazi ideology for the education of Slavs.

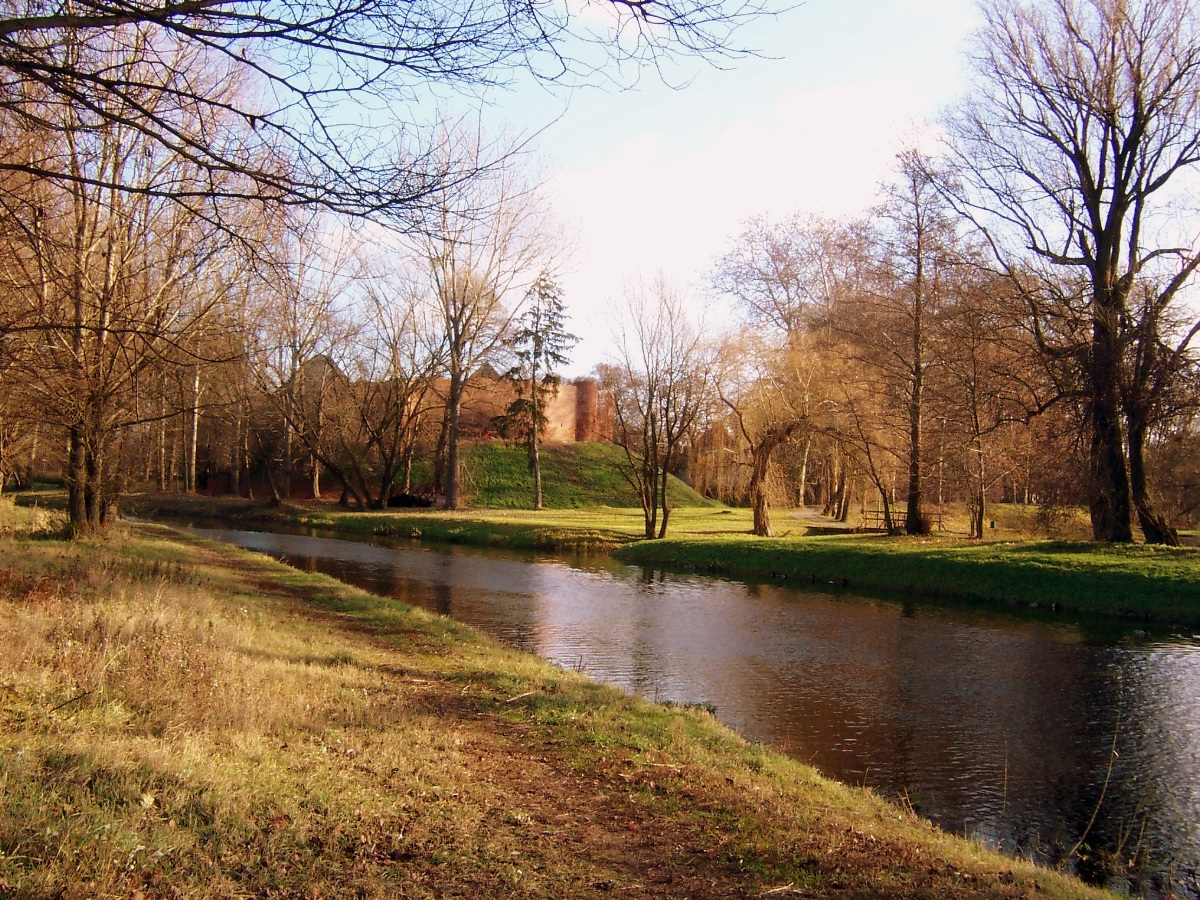
Obra River near Meseritz

With his Father's conscription into the war, later death, and the contention in the area his family resided, Zillmann, along with his mother and sister, spent the majority of the war fleeing violence, leading to poor living conditions throughout most of his youth, irrespective of his family's affluence in Meseritz. Eventually, he and his family would settle in Marburg, a university town in the Hessen Region of Germany. Zillmann was self-taught, his only means of gaining an education due to the widespread post-war resource shortages.

Zillmann would continue on to higher education studying German architecture at the Ulm School of Design, a new Bauhaus School of Architecture which had been re-opened by the Swiss architect Max Bill after its closure by Nazi authorities during the war. After the acquisition of his diploma in architecture in 1955, he began working with Max Bill, entering architecture competitions in Zurich, beginning city planning in Isfahan, and designing and planning several public projects in many other European cities.

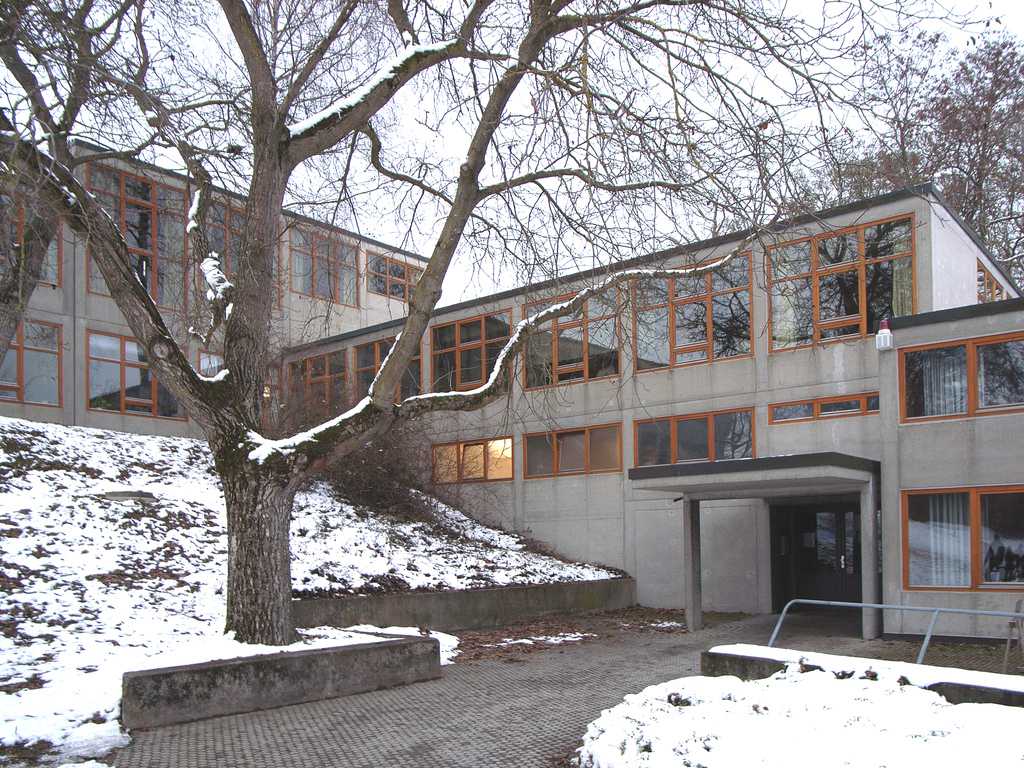
Ulm School of Design

Zillmann would go back to formal study at the Ulm School, studying in the fields of communication and cybernetics, engaging with many different academics in the field outside of Ulm such as the German aesthetics philosopher Max Bense at the University of Stuttgart and Professor of visual science Herbert Schober at the Ludwig-Maximilians-Universität München. Zillmann would acquire his diploma in communication and cybernetics in 1959 while also working as a scientific advisor for a holding company in Zurich. Zillmann's role predominantly involved the practical application of communications research to assist in marketing campaigns for several of the companies it parented, working there from 1959 - 1965.

=== Academic career (1968–2001) ===
In 1968, Zillmann moved to the United States in Madison, Wisconsin, where he was a doctoral student in communication and psychology at the University of Wisconsin. He would then move to Philadelphia in 1969, working in the University of Pennsylvania, which houses the oldest psychology department in North America, going on to acquire a doctorate in communication and social psychology there that same year from the Annenberg School. He would work as an assistant professor there until 1971, and would hold the position of associate professor from 1971 to 1975, teaching a range of subjects in both communication, psychology and general scientific methodology. It is during this time that the underpinnings of his excitation transfer theory were being tested and published.

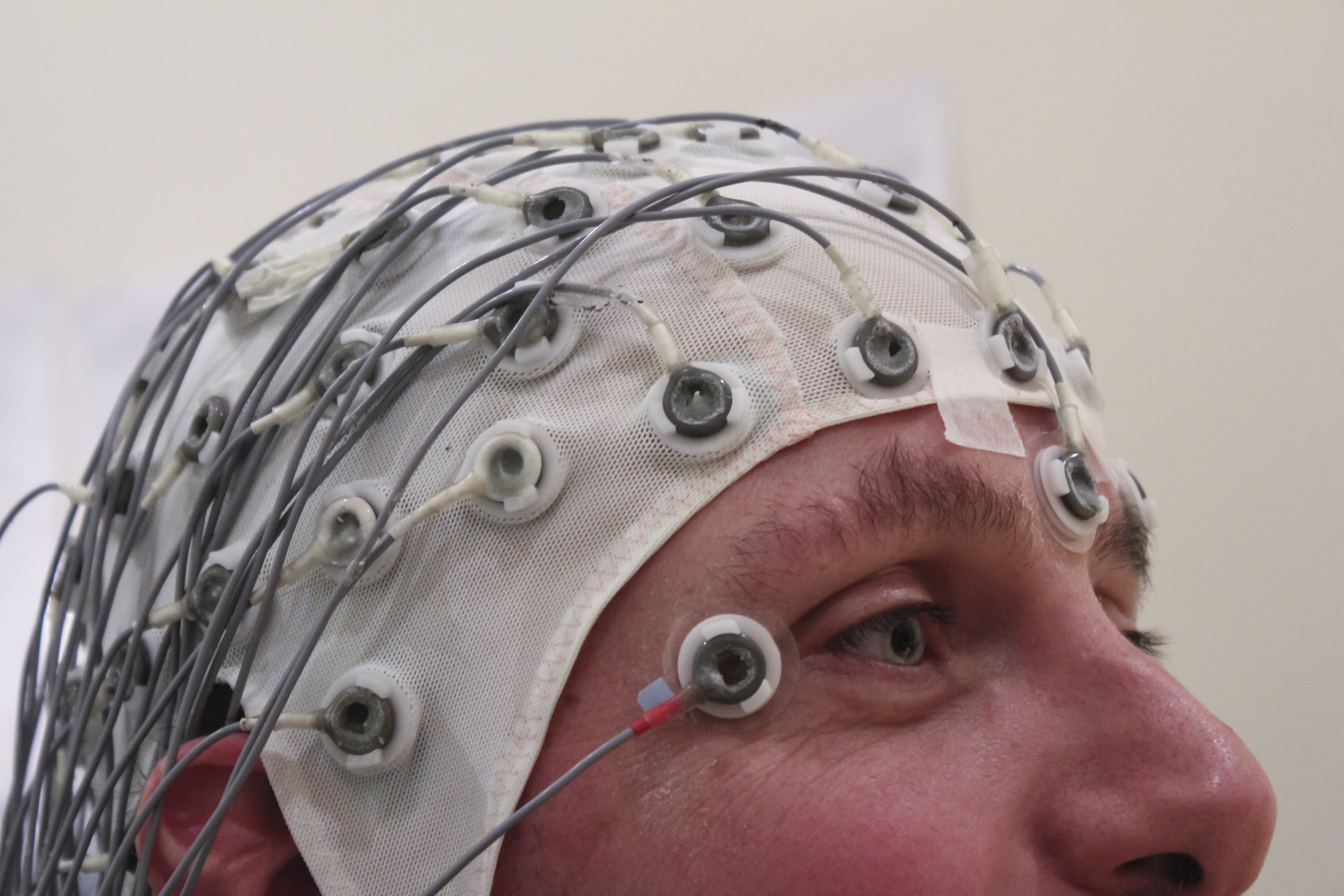
EEG recording cap, similar to those used by the ICR in research

Following his time at Philadelphia, Zillmann accepted an appointment as an associate professor and subsequently a full Professorial appointment in Communication and Psychology between 1975 and 1988 at Indiana University. Whilst continuing his own research Zillmann also established the Institute for Communications Research (ICR) at the university, Zillmann acting as the Director of the ICR from 1974 - 1988. The focus of the ICR is on both communication research and wider social scientific research in the field of media consumption, operating within Indiana University.

Zillmann would then move to the University of Alabama in Tuscaloosa, assuming the position of professor of communication and psychology and senior associate dean for graduate studies and research in 1989, leading the College of Communication and Information Sciences at the university. where he would formally retire from academic employment.

== Research ==
=== General ===
Zillmann has conducted research in media psychology and communication for 30 years developing a wide range of psychological and communications theories and models. His research has been in a range of domains, these include:

- Excitation transfer theory
- Three-factor theory of emotion
- Sex, aggression and emotion
- Selective exposure theory
- Affective disposition theory
- Mood management theory
- Entertainment theory
- Misattribution theory of humour
- Massive-exposure of media effects
- Sportsfanship
- Empathy theory

=== Three-factor theory of emotion ===
The three-factor theory of emotion proposed by Zillmann is an advancement of Schachter's two-factor theory model, which proposed that emotion and emotional excitation was the product of both one's interoception of internal physiological stimuli (e.g. blushing, sweating or shaking etc.) and the environmental stimuli (e.g. media, people or danger etc.) which one is currently engaged with. This cognitive approach to emotion emphasised context specific emotional appraisal and cognition in relation to the stimuli present in the environment along with the internal states one experiences to cognitively formulate the most appropriate emotional response in a particular circumstance. In Schachter's two-factor theory, as Reisenzein (1984) posits "physiological arousal is necessary for the experience of an emotion (feeling), but not for emotion-related behaviour. Zillmann combined Schachter's cognitive approach to emotion with Hullian Drive Theory, particularly in regards to Hull's concept of 'excitational residues' in the cognitive process of emotional responses, implicating that both present and prior excitatory stimuli affect both excitatory levels and emotional cognition. However, Zilllmann argues that the individual is usually unable to recognise this residual effect of prior stimuli on current response, leading to a disproportionate response to a current stimulus. It is from this three-factor theory of emotion Zillmann would construct the foundation of his Excitation Transfer Theory, which he attributes as his most significant contribution to the field of media psychology.

=== Excitation transfer theory ===
Zillmann's excitation transfer theory posits that residual emotional excitation from a particular stimulus will be carried over and applied to another stimulus. The excitatory response one has to the following stimulus will be in proportion with the levels of prior excitation from the first stimulus upon exposure to the latter, resulting in an over-exaggerated response to an otherwise low or moderate excitatory stimulus. Zillmann generalises emotion from distinguishable states and remain as such until the brain has established which emotional response to a given stimulus is appropriate.

The theory arose in a period of advancing media technology and concern for its effects upon the public, particularly children. In 1972, the appointed Surgeon General, Jesse Leonard Steinfeld delivered a report detailing his concern of the effects of violent media on childhood mental health and increased aggressive and anti social behaviour found to be associated with its consumption. Leo Bogart (1972) drew attention to the findings of David Clark and William Blankenburg who found that the ratings of violent programming was higher than that of other programming, Bogart stating that "Children's cartoon films are especially violent." This concern was reflected in the leading psychological research of the time with Albert Bandura's Social Learning Theory providing an experimentally valid association between the consumption of media and aggressive behaviour in children, in what is referred to as his 'Bobo Doll Experiment'. Wherein, Bandura demonstrated that modelling and imitative behaviour of observed aggression was present upon the viewing of a recorded clip of aggressive and violent behaviour. Zillmann's Excitation Theory served to explain the physiological and neurological underpinnings of the Surgeon General's findings whilst also expanding upon the psychological zeitgeist of the time.

As Zillmann states in a 2002 interview, excitation transfer theory is "a clear mechanism with well-defined, measurable variables for the prediction of effects. [Whilst also having] universal and ubiquitous applicability." Zillmann's research incorporated excitation transfer theory in a range of communications and media psychology studies, being as Bryant describes "cogent, elegant, and extremely comprehensive theory of communication and emotion that explains and predicts a vast array of human communication behaviours." In his 1971 study on the effects of aggressive, non-aggressive and erotic media, Zillmann found that the effect of aggressive stimuli more significantly increased excitatory responses than those of non-aggressive stimuli, resulting in higher rated aggressive behaviour. The study also found that erotic stimuli more significantly increased aggressive responses than even those of the aggressive stimulus, Zillmann would continue to study the excitatory effects of pornographic and other erotic material in later research.

In a 1999 study, Zillmann demonstrated the effects of repeated and extended exposure to violent media on hostility in men and women, finding that both provoked and unprovoked participants presented "markedly increased hostile behavior", and that these effects of media were similar across both men and women.

=== Pornography, aggression and emotion ===
Technological advances in the 1980s led to a far more accessible and public distribution of erotic media, leading to large increases in the consumption of pornographic content. In a study conducted with frequent collaborator Jennings Bryant, Zillmann found an increase in the usage of porn amongst younger age groups, and that the majority of teens and adults had at some point been exposed to pornographic content. Zillmann's research was predominantly engaged in the effects of pornography on both behavioural and attitudinal dispositions. In a 1971 study, pornographic content was found to be more emotionally excitatory in provoking aggressive behaviour than violent television, leading Zillmann to further explore this result. In a 1982 study, again alongside Bryant, Zillmann found that through continued 'massive' exposure to pornographic content for six weeks led to a loss of compassion for women as rape victims, an increase in opposition towards women's causes, a disposition towards less severe incarceration sentences for rapists and a higher degree of callousness toward women overall. Zillmann also observed the effect of frequent pornographic media consumption upon viewing habits; finding that as a result of either waning interest, increased curiosity or an entanglement of the two, those who viewed larger quantities of common practice pornography were more open to particular niche and fetishised pornographic material and also more violent or aggressive forms as well.

Zillmann proposes that in the same manner non-pornographic media can propagate a reality which is heavily mediated through its curators and the themes, leading to an altered subjective view of the world that diverges from reality; pornography alters perceptions of women, one's sexual expectations, and sexual practice. Due to a lack of 'primary experience', the distorted recounts of those in friend and familial settings, and the limited available academic information, Zillmann argues that one draws from pornography, which he says "provide[s] the closest approximation to primary experience." What he calls the "pornography answer" to the private world of sexuality. Prolonged exposure to mainstream pornography depicting heterosexual intercourse in a casual setting led to an increased devaluation of marriage, emotionally invested relationships, childbirth and child rearing. Instead, the participant's world view is altered through continuous exposure to the narrative constructed by the pornography they watch and as such associate more casual sexual relationships, as more enjoyable and risk-free. Zillmann states "The perceptual and evaluative changes that were evident in both genders are direct reflections of what can be considered the chief proclamation of pornography: great sexual joy without any attachment, commitment, or responsibility."

Zillmann emphasised his dissatisfaction with his research into the effects of pornography as a result of the continuous controversy and backlash faced upon publication of his results. In an interview, he states “Our research on the effects of pornography triggered an unimaginable avalanche of hostility from those deeming particular findings inopportune – that is, in conflict with their values regarding sexuality." Both from liberal and conservative groups, Zillmann's research was attacked in the media, and as a result of this Zillmann had discontinued his research into pornography due to threats made to his fellow researchers, only recently continuing research in the area.

== Publications ==
=== Books ===
- 1979 Hostility and Aggression
- 1984 Connections Between Sex and Aggression
- 1985 Selective Exposure To Communication
- 1989 Pornography: Research Advances and Policy Considerations
- 1991 Responding to the Screen: reception and Reaction Processes
- 1994 Media Effects: Advances in Theory and Research
- 1994 Media, Children, and the Family: Social Scientific, Psychodynamic, and Clinical Perspectives
- 1998 Connections Between Sexuality and Aggression, 2nd ed.
- 2000 Media Entertainment: The Psychology of Its Appeal
- 2000 Exemplification in Communication: The Influence of Case Reports on the Perception of Issues
- 2002 Media Effects: Advances in Theory and Research, 2nd ed.
- 2013 Selective Exposure to Communication

== Awards ==
- Burnum Distinguished Faculty Award, 2001
