= Media technology =

Media technology may refer to:

- Data storage devices
- Art media technology – Category:Visual arts media
- Print media technology – Category:Printing
- Digital media technology – Category:Digital media
- Electronic media technology – Category:Digital media or Category:Electronic publishing
- Media technology university programmes
- Media psychology, the field of study that examines media, technology and the effect on human behavior
