= The Mailman (novel) =

1991 novel by Bentley Little

- Author: Bentley Little
- Language: English
- Publication date: 1991

The Mailman is a 1991 horror novel by American author Bentley Little. Like most of Little's work, it follows the development of unexplained events in a small Arizona town, in this case revolving around a demonic mailman.

== Synopsis ==
English teacher Doug Albin, his wife Tritia, and their son Billy live in the small town of Willis, Arizona, and are shocked to learn of the suicide of their friendly, beloved, and seemingly content long-term mail carrier. A replacement arrives by the name of John Smith, an evasive and vaguely threatening man with pale skin and flame-red hair. When disturbances in the delivery of letters begin to occur, Doug comes to suspect that the strange new mailman is up to something sinister, an idea bolstered as people in town start receiving increasingly disturbing hate mail.

== Themes ==
Although the mailman is ultimately responsible for numerous violent acts that occur in the town of the story, he doesn't commit any of them himself, instead launching psychological assaults on the people he delivers mail to, so that their sanity breaks and they are driven to sickening acts of homicide, rape, torture, and even mass murder.

In this way, he exposes the weak veneer of civilization, being able to make savages of ordinary people just by the letters that appear in their mailbox, purporting to be from friends and family members, destroying their faith in the outside world. For instance, he makes one believe that his younger brother, who died in the Vietnam War, sent him letters revealing himself to be a jaded psychopath who raped and murdered native girls.

The exact nature of the mailman and his motivations are never fully explained, though he is clearly a sadistic demonic entity that finds expression through the US Postal Service. It's occasionally suggested that he has no motive at all, beyond maybe his own amusement.
