= Großer Zillmannsee =

Lake in Mecklenburg-Vorpommern, Germany

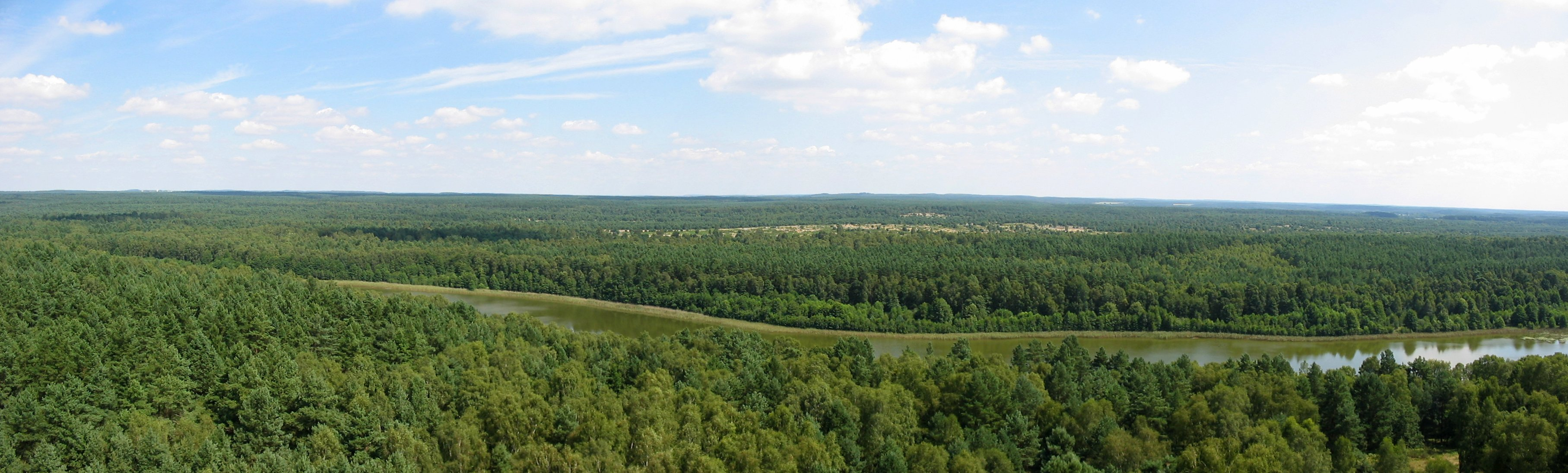

- Location within Mecklenburg-Vorpommern
- Location: Mecklenburgische Seenplatte, Mecklenburg-Vorpommern
- Coordinates: 53°25′49″N 12°51′47″E
- Basin countries: Germany
- Surface area: 0.141 km^{2} (0.054 sq mi)
- Surface elevation: 66.5 m (218 ft)

Großer Zillmannsee is a lake in the Mecklenburgische Seenplatte district in Mecklenburg-Vorpommern, Germany. At an elevation of 66.5 m, its surface area is 0.141 km^{2}.
