= Winter wonderland =

United Kingdom Christmas season funfairs

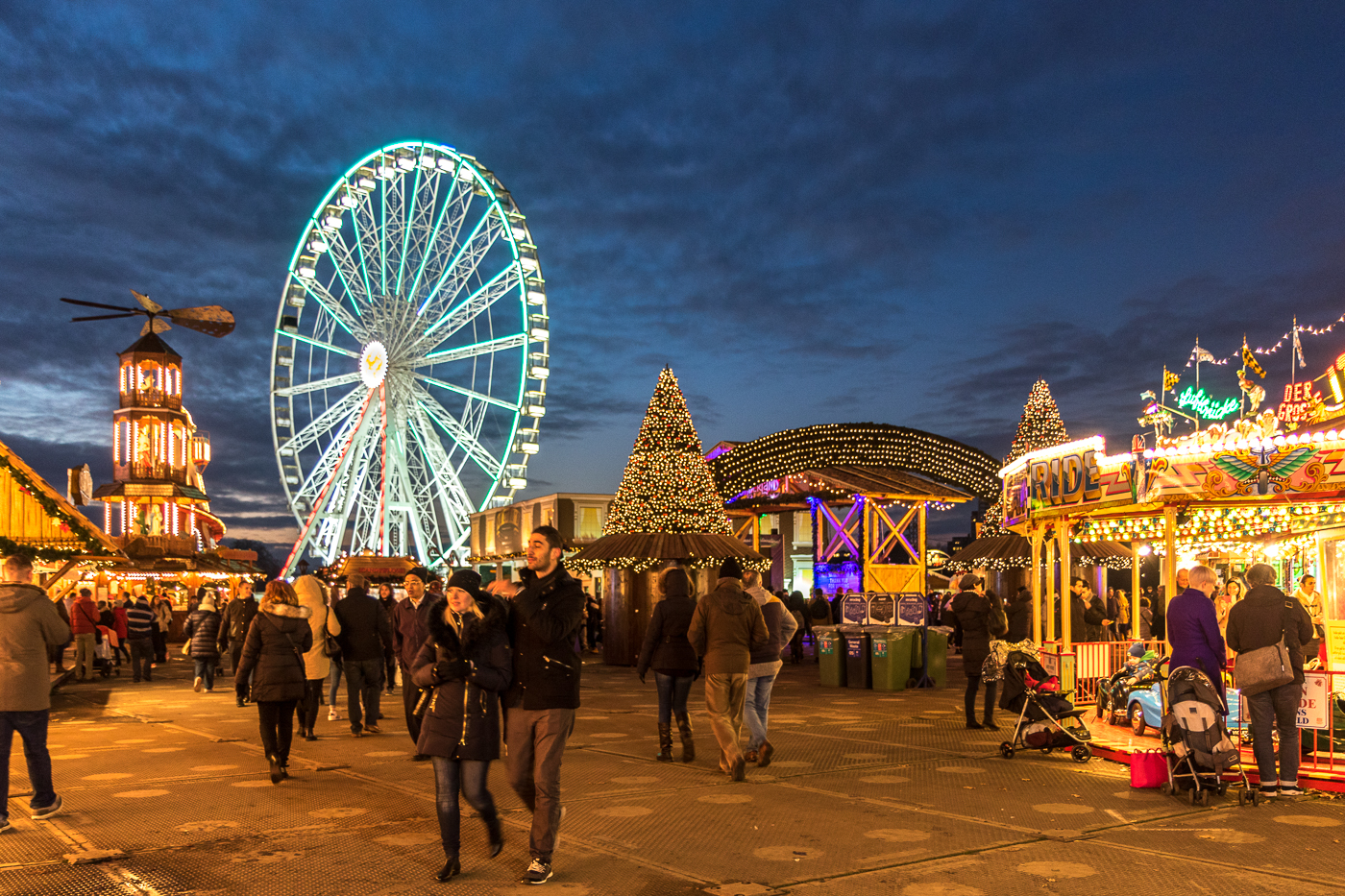
Hyde Park Winter Wonderland in 2015

A winter wonderland or Christmas fair is the catch all name for a funfair held mainly in the United Kingdom around the Christmas season. A winter wonderland usually includes attractions such as a German-style Christmas market, Santa's grotto, amusement rides and ice skating rinks. Winter wonderlands range from small-scale single-day events to large city centre fairs lasting several weeks.

Many British cities host winter wonderlands similar to the Christmas markets held on the European continent, with London's Hyde Park Winter Wonderland drawing over 3 million guests in 2019. Independent winter wonderlands are also common, similar in format to a travelling carnival, and the often high prices and poor quality attractions at these have become notorious. Journalist Isabelle Fraser, writing in The Daily Telegraph, described "rubbish British Christmas festival" as being a "tradition", and there are regular news stories about these events.

== History ==
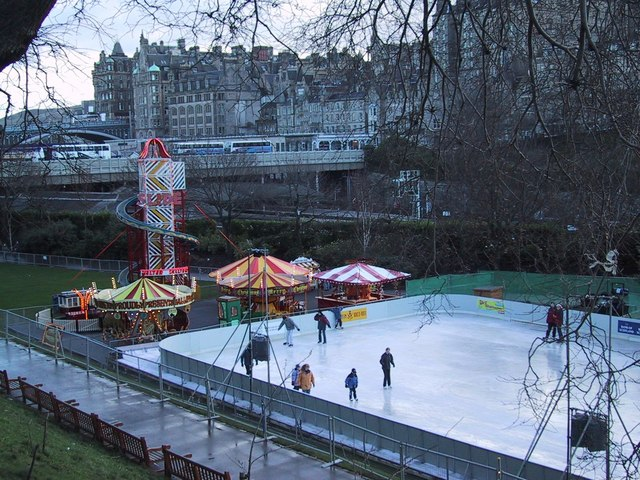
Ice skating at Princes Street Gardens in 2000, a precursor to the Edinburgh's Christmas wonderland.

In the Little Ice Age, when the European climate was much cooler, frost fairs on frozen rivers provided outdoor skating and other entertainment, but these died out by the 19th century as winters became milder. Winter wonderlands are a relatively recent invention – the UK does not have a tradition of Christmas markets as seen in Germany, and the weather in December is now usually too mild for snow or ice.

The modern British winter wonderland started in the early 2000s, driven by a combination of boosterism by local councils and entrepreneurs. One of the first was the Christmas fair on Princes Street Gardens in Edinburgh, started in 1999 partly to reduce crowding at Hogmanay following a crowd crush, and which became "Edinburgh's Christmas". The Hyde Park Winter Wonderland was another early winter wonderland in the UK, opening in 2005 as a modest funfair organised by The Royal Parks, but it significantly expanded after it was taken over by private enterprise in 2007 and by 2012 the event encompassed ice skating, a ferris wheel, multiple rollercoasters and themed areas such as a Bavarian village, a circus and "Santa Land". Other towns and cities followed with similar events, with some of the largest being held in Nottingham, Portsmouth, Norwich, York, Newcastle upon Tyne and Birmingham.

== Criticism and "winter blunderlands" ==
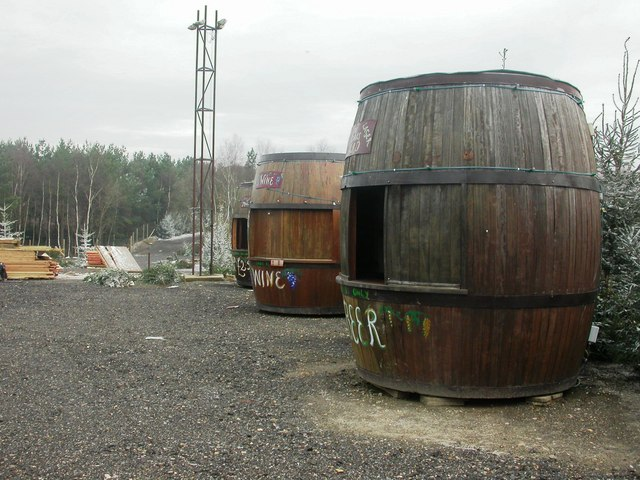
The poor quality of Lapland New Forest made the site notorious as a "winter blunderland".

Winter wonderlands draw large crowds, which means that at peak times they can be extremely loud and busy. Heavy drinking by guests often leads to crowd control problems and violence. Many have also been criticised for being overly commercialised, with high prices and a heavy emphasis on sales, although visitors tend to spend less than they intended to at wonderlands. Heavy stalls and rides as well as footfall from numerous guests damage the ground, especially in typical wet wintry conditions, and it can take months for public parks to recover from the impact of hosting a winter wonderland.

Most have a narrow emphasis on Christmas traditions from central and northern Europe – especially Germany (particularly Bavaria) and the Nordics (particularly Lapland) – which has been noted as being both inauthentic to traditional British Christmas traditions (especially as the UK lacks the regular snow experienced in these areas) and for ignoring the modern diversity of Christmas traditions practised by immigrant communities in major cities such as London.

But like the widely derided round robin Christmas missives, these Christmas disasters have become such a satisfying British tradition we could hardly let a December go past without pictures of a muddy field, sad reindeer and crying children and their irate parents.

— Isabelle Fraser, The Daily Telegraph

Following the spread of city-run winter wonderlands came a large number of privately organised events attempting to copy the formula. These events have become notorious for high prices, poor quality and animal welfare violations, and news reports on the most disastrous examples have become a tradition during the Christmas silly season. An early example was the 2008 Lapland New Forest in Hampshire, which charged a £25 entrance fee, with extra fees for the grotto and the market, and became the subject of considerable negative coverage due to its few attractions and long queues, rude staff members, and reindeer and huskies kept in poor conditions. Since then, numerous other attractions have been dubbed "winter blunderlands", including Lapland West Midlands in 2008, Milton Keynes Winter Wonderland in 2013, Yorkshire's Magical Winterland and Laurence Llewelyn Bowen's Magical Journey in 2014, Bakewell Winter Wonderland in 2016 and Enchanted at Balgone Estate in 2022.
