= Misattribution of arousal =

Psychological phenomenon

In psychology, misattribution of arousal is the process whereby people make a mistake in assuming what is causing them to feel aroused. For example, when actually experiencing physiological responses related to fear, people mislabel those responses as romantic arousal. The reason physiological symptoms may be attributed to incorrect stimuli is because many stimuli have similar physiological symptoms such as increased blood pressure or shortness of breath.

One of the initial studies looking into this phenomenon conducted by Schachter and Singer (1962) was based on the idea that the experience of arousal could be ambiguous and therefore misattributed to an incorrect stimulus. Operating under this assumption, the researchers developed the two-factor theory of emotion. Misattribution of arousal, which is an influence on emotion processing, can be found in multiple situations, such as romantic situations and physiological responses from exercise.

An example of the possible effects of misattribution of arousal is perceiving a potential partner as more attractive because of a heightened state of physiological stress. A study done by White et al. (1981) investigated this phenomenon and found that those in an unrelated aroused state will rate an attractive confederate more highly than a rater without arousal. The researchers also found that aroused raters would dislike an unattractive confederate more than those without arousal.

== Initial demonstration ==
=== Experiment ===
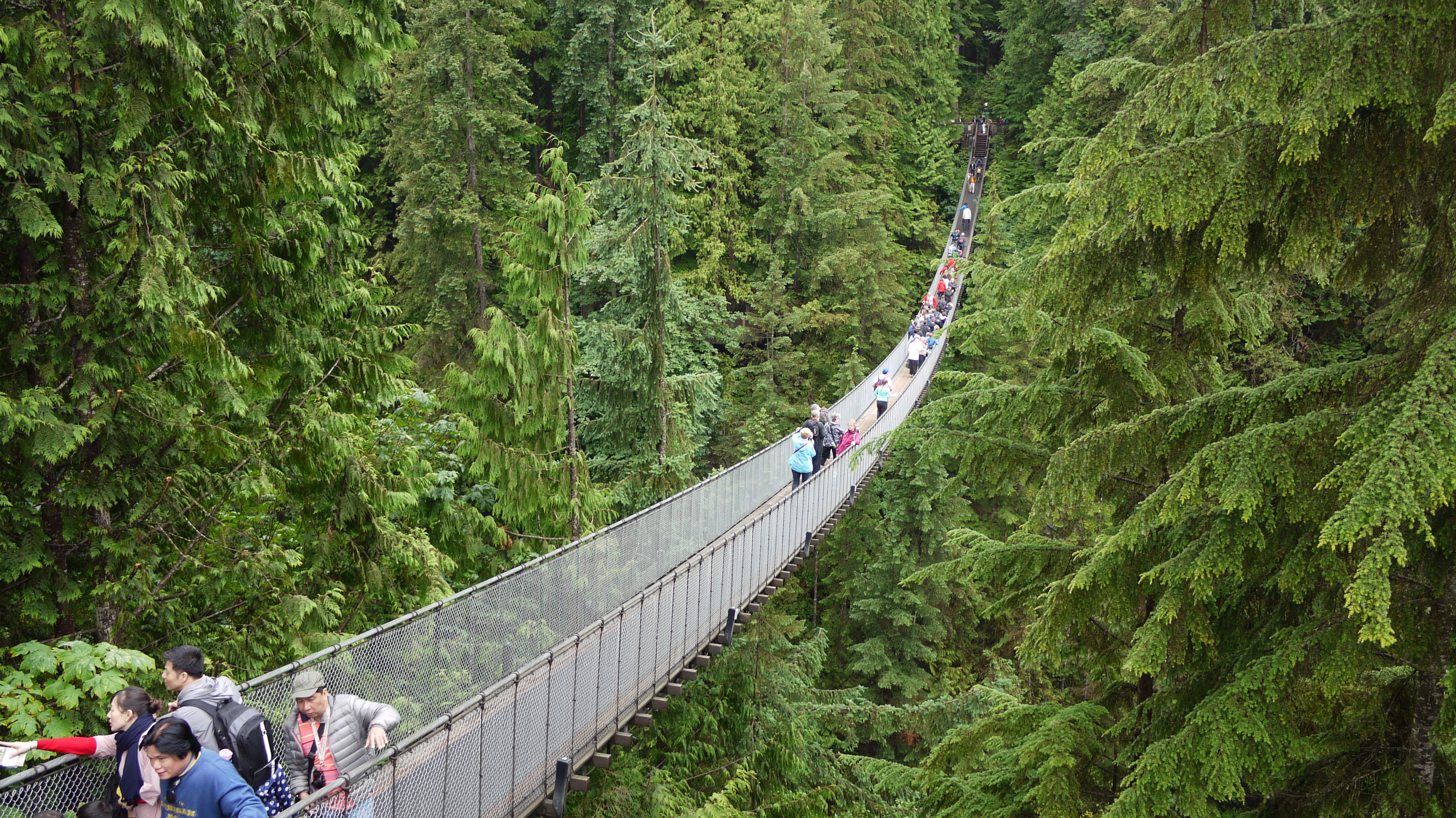
The Capilano Suspension Bridge in BC, Canada, where the experiment was conducted.

Donald Dutton and Arthur Aron's study (1974) to test the causation of misattribution of arousal incorporated an attractive confederate woman to wait at the end of a bridge that was either a suspension bridge (that would induce fear) or a sturdy bridge (that would not induce fear). After the men crossed the bridge, they were stopped by a female confederate and took a Thematic Apperception Test wherein they had to compose a short story based on an ambiguous image; the image chosen was purposely not sexual at all. Afterward, the story was analyzed for sexual content. As the men finished the survey, the female confederate, who was not aware of the experimental hypothesis, explained she would be available to answer any questions regarding her project, giving her phone number and name to the male subjects. Dutton and Aron wondered if the participants were more likely to call the woman because they were physically attracted to her or not. However, Dutton and Aron had to take into consideration that some factors of the men, such as the possibility of some men already being involved in a relationship or how an individual male interpreted the woman's body gestures. Therefore, Dutton and Aron had the woman survey the men under two conditions: immediately after they crossed a 450-foot (140 m)-long bridge or after they had crossed and had enough time to rest. In the first condition, the men who were surveyed during their cross over the bridge would have had their arousal level increased as they were speaking to the woman. Conditions such as experiencing winds during their walk and the nervous feeling may have contributed to their fast-paced heartbeats and rapid breathing.

In the other condition, the woman had approached the men after they had crossed the bridge. They had enough time to rest and get their heartbeat and breathing back to normal.

=== Results ===
More males contacted the female experimenter when they had just walked down the suspension bridge, which was thought to be due to their misattribution of their arousal (they believed that they were feeling sexual arousal at the sight of the woman instead of feeling the leftover physiological arousal from the fear of walking across the suspension bridge). This was interpreted by the researchers to mean that the men found the woman more attractive when they had more anxiety about crossing the bridge. There were no significant differences on either bridge when the researchers used a male confederate to administer the Thematic Apperception Test and his phone number for any further questions about the experiment.

== Subsequent research ==
=== Experiment: expansion on initial demonstration ===
Fear is not the only emotion that can result in misattribution of arousal. One of the earlier studies that focused on misattribution of arousal was done by Schachter and Singer in 1962. The researchers told the participants in their study that they were testing how their vision responded to a shot of vitamins called Suproxin. Suproxin was actually a shot of epinephrine or a placebo. Epinephrine activated the sympathetic nervous system and produced symptoms such as an elevated heart rate and blood pressure. The researchers then either told the participants the effects of the epinephrine, said nothing about any potential effects of the epinephrine, or told them they may feel some effects that had nothing to do with the epinephrine (for example, the researchers told the participants they could experience a headache from the shot). The participants were told that they had to wait 20 minutes for the Suproxin to get into their bloodstreams. While they were waiting, a confederate (a participant who is also covertly collaborating with/an associate of the researchers) who was either euphoric or angry waited with the participant to see if the emotion of the participant could be manipulated by the epinephrine and the emotion of the confederate. The confederate played basketball with pieces of balled-up scrap paper while in the euphoric state or had to take a questionnaire and became very angry with the personal questions in the anger state. The participants then were observed to see if they appeared to be angry or euphoric and took a self-reported survey about their mood.

They found that if someone was physiologically aroused without being aware of it, they would attribute their arousal to a recent thought in their memory. The researchers also found that emotions (in this study, euphoria and anger) could be manipulated by providing a participant with a shot of epinephrine.

=== Experiment: influence on confidence ===
Misattribution of arousal can also influence how much confidence one feels before completing a task. One study conducted by Savitsky, Medvec, Charlton, and Gilovich focused on how confidence can be affected by misattribution of arousal. Typically, people feel more confident before they are supposed to do a task, but the closer they get to having to perform that task, the less confident they feel, which could be due to the arousal from the expectation of the performance. The researchers told participants that they would be exposed to a subliminal noise and were then asked if they could predict how well they would do on two tasks. After they made their predictions, the researchers either told them that the noise could make them nervous, the noise would have no effect on them, or they were told that they would not have to do the tasks until the next session a month away after they were exposed to the noise. The tasks were to unscramble anagrams or to recall as many nonsense syllables as they could after seeing them briefly. They could earn money for the tasks (more money was earned for each anagram unscrambled or each syllable correctly recalled). The participants then predicted how well they did on the tasks, and how well they believed everyone else did on the task. A second experiment replicated this first experiment. The researchers had participants attribute their arousal to noises that they heard, which resulted in those participants feeling more confident that they did well on the tasks than those that attributed their arousal to the performance anxiety from the task.

=== Experiment: polarity ===
White, Fishbein, and Rutsein generated further research on the misattribution of arousal with their 1981 study, "Passionate Love and the Misattribution of Arousal". The researchers performed their study using two experiments. In the first experiment, 54 male participants were placed under varying degrees of physical exertion, in order to create a state of arousal. The participants were then asked to view a video of a female confederate either manipulated to be attractive or unattractive. The video was a self-disclosure statement where the female discussed hobbies and other typically dating-related material. After completing the video, participants were given thirteen attraction trait criteria on which to rate the female. The experiment confirmed the researcher's hypothesis that individuals in a neutral aroused state were more likely to rate a target as attractive than an unaroused individual.

White, Fishbein, and Rutsein hypothesized that the polarity of an individual's arousal could influence the impact of the misattribution of arousal. To test this hypothesis, the researchers created three separate videos to prime the subjects with a positive, negative, or neutral arousal. Sixty-six male participants were asked to watch one of the videos and then rate the female as in the first study. The study found that regardless of the stimuli's polarity, the participants in the aroused state found the attractive confederate more attractive and the unattractive confederate as less attractive than the unaroused participants.

=== Experiment: conditional emotional responses ===
A study done by Loftis and Ross in 1974 looked at the effects of misattribution of arousal upon acquisition and extinction of a conditional emotional response. They conducted two experiments with 89 female undergraduates to show that misattribution procedures can alter physiological response to a conditioned source of a fear or arousal. The results suggested that self-perception and attribution play a major role in emotional response.

=== Experiment: alternate model ===
Additionally, a study conducted by Allen, Kenrick, Linder and McCall in 1989 suggested an alternative explanation to the misattribution of arousal in terms of attraction arousal (as there are other types of arousal that can be misattributed). The original model of misattribution of arousal essentially states that the person who is aroused will only be attracted to the target person, so long as they are unaware of the true cause of arousal. Allen et al. propose a different model called Response-Facilitation, in which they suggest that the subject that is aroused will be more attracted to the target person (compared to people who are unaroused), regardless of if they know the true source of the stimulation. To test this new model, they ran two studies in which they manipulated the type of arousal the participants experienced and the salience (awareness) of the arousal. In one study, they put the participants into three different groups: control (no arousal), arousal-awareness (where they were put in front of an attractive person, but knew what the actual cause of arousal (exercise) was), and arousal-unaware (where they were put in front of an attractive person but didn't realize the true cause of arousal). After conducting the study, the researchers found that regardless of whether the person was aware of the true cause of arousal, they were still more attracted to the target person than those in the control condition. In other words, whereas the original theory of misattribution of arousal said that people could only misattribute their arousal if they were unaware of the true cause, the Response-Facilitation model states that it is possible that people could be aware of the true cause of arousal and still find themselves attracted to someone, compared to people who are unaroused. This demonstrates another potential model that could explain the attraction-arousal component of the misattribution of arousal theory.

== See also ==
- Alexithymia
- Two-factor theory of emotion
- Misattribution theory of humor
- Mistaken perception of romance in non-romantic relationships
- There are no atheists in foxholes
