= Dick Millman =

American businessman

- Born: Richard Millman
- Occupation: Chief Executive Officer

Dick Millman is the former CEO of Bell Helicopter. He has resided in this position since 2007. Before Bell, Millman was president of Textron Systems following a 20-year career with Avco.
