= Mailman Group =

Chinese sports media company

- Type: Private
- Founded: January 1, 1999; 27 years ago
- Headquarters: Shanghai, China

Mailman Group is a sports digital consultancy and social media agency in China. Based in Shanghai, Mailman manages the digital presence of international brands in the sports, entertainment, and travel industries. One of the first agencies to enter the digital Chinese market, Mailman has pioneered many of China's early technology and social media initiatives. It helped international brands on Chinese social media to pull content from Facebook and Twitter, sites that are banned in China, and publish directly on Chinese social media.

== Organization ==
Mailman consists of a variety of separate partnerships, investments and ventures that focus on the sports, entertainment, and tourism industries. They include:

=== KAWO ===
Because of the Great Firewall, many social media networks are blocked in China. KAWO is a social media management technology that lets brands get into Chinese social media by integrating the Western social media channels Facebook, Twitter, and Instagram, with the Chinese Weibo, Tencent Weibo, and WeChat. KAWO gives brands digital access to over 600 million people by automatically pulling their existing Facebook and Twitter content onto a central dashboard, where moderators translate and then push it via KAWO directly on a brand's Chinese social network accounts

=== MVIP ===
MVIP serves as a marketplace tailored to Chinese consumers, focusing on sports and entertainment offerings.

=== FansTang ===
Fanstang is a company developed in partnership with China Branding Group to connect US Celebrities with their Chinese fans. Fanstang is an entertainment platform now established as the largest management firm for China-specific media accounts for US celebrities.

Mailman annually releases the Red Card reports, which analyze the performance of top European football clubs within the Chinese social media environment.
