= Millman =

Millman is a surname. Notable people with the surname include:

- Bird Millman (1890–1940), American tightrope walker
- Bob Millman (1903–1963), American football player
- Dan Millman (born 1946), American author and lecturer
- Debbie Millman (born 1961), American podcaster
- Dick Millman, American chief executive
- Edward Millman (1907–1964), American painter
- Geoff Millman (1934–2005), English cricketer
- Gregory Millman, American journalist
- Irving Millman (1923–2012), American virologist
- Jacob Millman (1911–1991), professor of electrical engineering
- Joan Millman (born 1940), American politician
- Joanne Millman (born 1961), Australian soccer player
- John Millman (born 1989), Australian tennis player
- John Millman (cyclist) (1930–2021), Canadian cyclist
- Lawrence Millman (born 1946), American mycologist
- Michael Millman (1939–2014), American criminal defense lawyer
- Norman Craig Millman (1890–1981), Canadian aviator
- Peter Millman (1906–1990), Canadian astronomer
- Richard Millman (historian) (1932–1983), American historian
- Robert Millman (1939–2017), American physician
- Simon Millman (born 1977), Australian politician
- Spencer Millman, TV producer

== Fictional characters ==
- Andy Millman, British television sitcom character

== See also ==
- Milman
