= Misattribution theory of humor =

Theory of humor

Misattribution is one of many theories of humor that describes an audience's inability to identify exactly why they find a joke to be funny. The formal theory is attributed to Zillmann & Bryant (1980) in their article, "Misattribution Theory of Tendentious Humor", published in Journal of Experimental Social Psychology. They derived the critical concepts of the theory from Sigmund Freud's Wit and Its Relation to the Unconscious, originally published in 1905. Freud declared those incapable of knowing exactly what it is they find amusing due to the complex nature of their conscious and subconscious minds.

== Tendentious vs. innocuous humor ==
Freud made a key distinction between tendentious and non-tendentious humor. Tendentious humor involves a "victim", someone at whose expense we laugh. Non-tendentious humor does not require a victim. This innocuous humor typically depends on wordplay, and Freud believed it has only modest power to evoke amusement. Tendentious humor, then, is the only kind that can evoke big laughs. However, Freud believed a mixture of both tendentious and non-tendentious humor is required to keep the tendentious humor from becoming too offensive or demeaning to its victim. The innocent jokework of the innocuous humor would mask the otherwise hostile joke and therefore "bribe" our senses, allowing us to laugh at what would otherwise be socially unacceptable. Therefore, we often think we are laughing at innocuous jokes, but what really makes them funny is their socially unacceptable nature hidden below the surface.

== Empirical study ==
To further examine Freud's concepts, media scholars Dolf Zillmann and Jennings Bryant set up an experimental situation to combine or separate tendentious and non-tendentious humor. Their findings confirmed the expectations that amusement was highest when all of the ingredients of good comedy were present. In conjunction with disposition theory of mirth (Zillmann & Cantor, 1976), audiences predictably enjoyed witnessing the demise of a disliked character. However, the mere presence of the innocuous humor cue more than doubled the amusement in response to the observed misfortune. The applications to humor in film, television, and other media are quite apparent. However, very little research has been conducted to follow up Zillmann & Bryant's original experiment.

== Example in today's comedy ==
Sitcom and comedy films are filled with humor based on misattribution. For example, characters in a working-class family may banter back and forth about paying bills or finding a more respected or higher-paying job. The delivery of dialog may come across as funny for an audience who believes the humor comes from the antagonistic relationship between the two characters. But the real hostile nature of the joke involves class and economic issues that are otherwise not funny.

Similar analysis can be applied to issues involving racial discrimination, sexual deviance, drug abuse, and other controversial issues.

== See also ==
- Misattribution of arousal
- Punching up and punching down
