= 1956 in science =

The year 1956 in science and technology involved some significant events, listed below.

== Biology ==
- March – Denham Harman proposes the free-radical theory of aging.
- Wesley K. Whitten reports developing eight-cell mouse ova to blastocyst stage in vitro.
- Capri Bird Observatory is established on Capri.

== Chemistry ==
- July 14 – Second part of the publication of Dorothy Hodgkin's description of the structure of Vitamin B_{12}.

== Climatology ==
- May – Gilbert Plass publishes his seminal article "The Carbon Dioxide Theory of Climate Change".

== Computer science ==
- July 13 – John McCarthy (Dartmouth), Marvin Minsky (MIT), Claude Shannon (Bell Labs) and Nathaniel Rochester (IBM) assemble the first coordinated research meeting on the topic of artificial intelligence, at Dartmouth College, Hanover, New Hampshire, in the United States.
- September 13 – The hard disk drive is invented by an IBM team led by Reynold B. Johnson.
- TX-0 transistorized computer completed at MIT Lincoln Laboratory in the United States.

== Mathematics ==
- February 1 – Joseph Kruskal publishes Kruskal's algorithm.
- December – Martin Gardner begins his Mathematical Games column in Scientific American.
- Henri Cartan and Samuel Eilenberg publish a text on homological algebra.
- Jean-Pierre Serre publishes his "GAGA" paper in algebraic geometry and analytic geometry.

== Medicine ==
- April – Humphry Osmond first proposes use of the word psychedelic to describe the effect of certain drugs, at a meeting of the New York Academy of Sciences.
- May 1 – Minamata disease epidemic is identified in Japan by Hajime Hosokawa.
- June 1 – Elsie Stephenson becomes founding Director of the Nurse Teaching Unit, University of Edinburgh, the first nurse teaching unit within a British university.
- November – The classic definition of obesity hypoventilation syndrome is published.
- Asian flu pandemic originates in China.
- Use of penicillamine in treatment of Wilson's disease first described.
- American voice actor Paul Winchell applies to patent an implantable artificial heart, the first person to do so.

== Physics ==
- November 15 – Cooper pairs are first described by Leon Cooper.
- November 21 – DIDO heavy water enriched uranium nuclear reactor opens at the Atomic Energy Research Establishment, Harwell, Oxfordshire, England.
- Existence of the antineutrino is experimentally confirmed by the Cowan–Reines neutrino experiment carried out by Clyde L. Cowan and Frederick Reines.
- Existence of the antineutron is experimentally confirmed by University of California, Berkeley physicist Bruce Cork.

== Psychology ==
- January 1 – Leon Festinger, Henry W. Riecken and Stanley Schachter's book When Prophecy Fails provides a classic study of disconfirmed expectancy.

== Technology ==
- April 14 – 2-inch quadruplex videotape, the first practical and commercially successful analog recording videotape format, is released for the broadcast television industry by Ampex of Redwood City, California.
- April 17 – Eugene Houdry is granted a patent for the automobile catalytic converter.
- June 8 – General Electric/Telechron introduces model 7H241 "The Snooz Alarm", first snooze alarm clock.
- August 27 – Calder Hall nuclear power station in England is first connected to the National Grid. This Magnox plant is the world's first nuclear power plant to deliver electricity in commercial quantities. Official opening is on October 17.
- November 11 – First flight of Convair B-58, the first supersonic jet bomber capable of Mach 2 flight, designed by Robert H. Widmer.
- First Chamberlin electro-mechanical keyboard instrument, developed and patented by Wisconsin inventor Harry Chamberlin, is introduced.

== Awards ==
- Nobel Prizes
  - Physics – William Bradford Shockley, John Bardeen, Walter Houser Brattain
  - Chemistry – Sir Cyril Norman Hinshelwood, Nikolay Nikolaevich Semenov
  - Medicine – André Frédéric Cournand, Werner Forssmann, Dickinson W. Richards

== Births ==
- February 28 – Penny Sackett, American-born Australian astronomer and Chief Scientist.
- April 16 – David M. Brown (died 2003), American astronaut.
- April 19 – Anne Glover, Scottish biologist.
- May 3 – Carlo Rovelli, Italian-born theoretical physicist.
- May 20 – Marlene Zuk, American biologist.
- July 1 – Gregg L. Semenza, American cell biologist, recipient of the Nobel Prize in Physiology or Medicine.
- July 25 – Frances Arnold, American biochemist, recipient of the Nobel Prize in Chemistry.
- September 9 – Avi Wigderson, Israeli-born mathematician.
- October 17 – Mae Jemison, African American engineer and astronaut.
- October 19 – Carlo Urbani (died 2003), Italian physician, discoverer of SARS.
- December 23 – Simon Wessely, English psychiatrist.
- David Nott, Welsh-born surgeon.
- Zhuo-Hua Pan, Chinese-born neuroscientist

== Deaths ==
- February 3 – Émile Borel (born 1871), French mathematician.
- February 28 – Frigyes Riesz (born 1880), Hungarian mathematician.
- March 17 – Irène Joliot-Curie (born 1897), French radiochemist, recipient of the Nobel Prize in Chemistry.
- March 22 – George Sarton (born 1884), Belgian American historian of science.
- May 24 – Martha Annie Whiteley (born 1866), English chemist and mathematician.
- August 25 – Alfred Kinsey (born 1894), American biologist, professor of entomology and zoology, and sexologist who founded the Institute for Sex Research at Indiana University (Bloomington).
- September 22 – Frederick Soddy (born 1877), English radiochemist.
- October 30 – María Teresa Ferrari (born 1887), Argentine physician.
- November 10 – Henry Luke Bolley (born 1865), American plant pathologist.
- November 24 – Sir Lionel Whitby (born 1895), English haematologist, clinical pathologist, pharmacologist and army officer.
