= Apocalypticism =

Religious belief about the end of the world

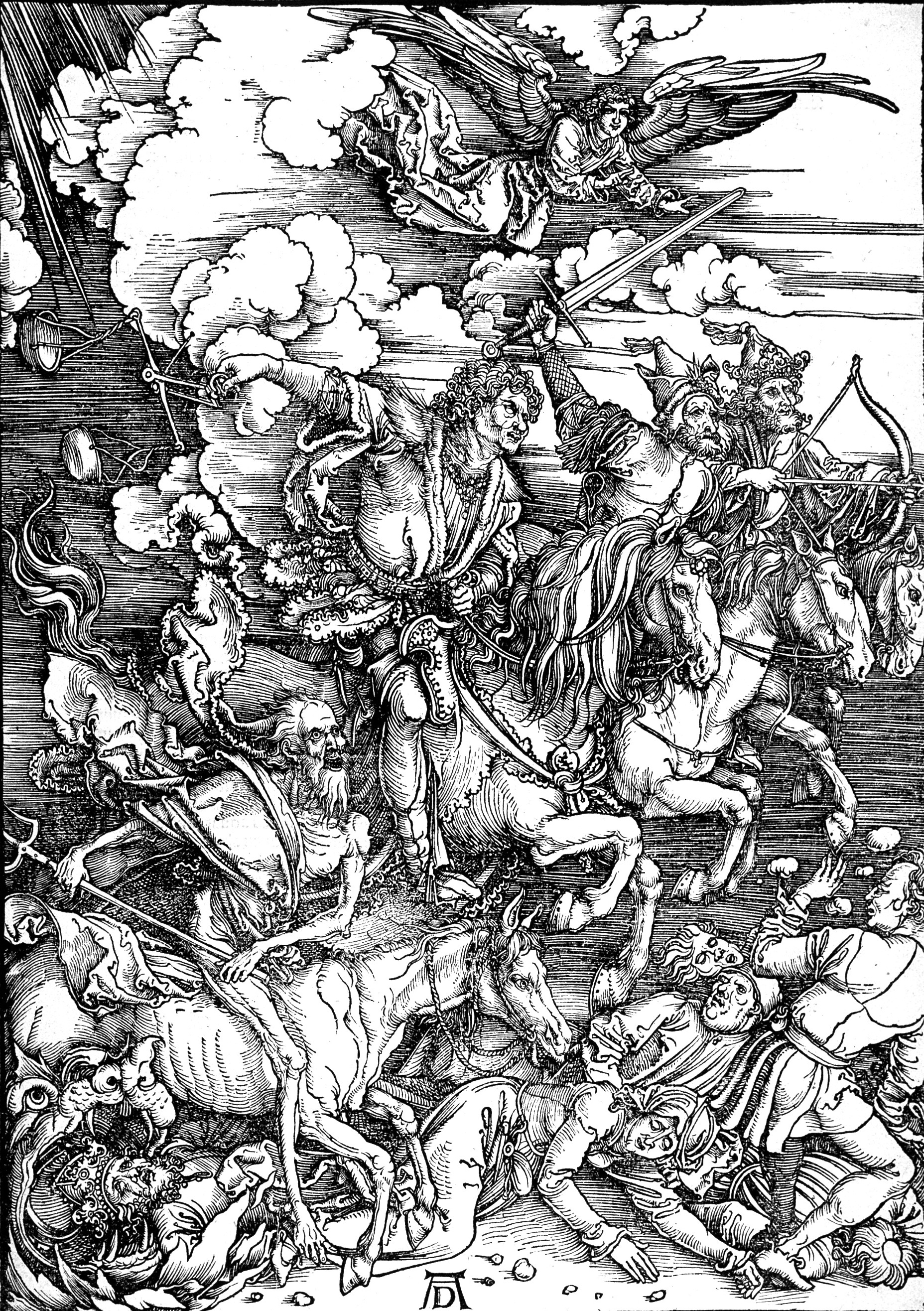
Four Horsemen of the Apocalypse, woodcut print from the Apocalypse of Albrecht Dürer (1497–1498), Staatliche Kunsthalle Karlsruhe

Apocalypticism is the religious belief that the end of the world is imminent, even within one's own lifetime. This belief is usually accompanied by the idea that civilization will soon come to a tumultuous end due to some sort of catastrophic global event.

Apocalypticism is one aspect of eschatology in certain religions, the part of theology concerned with the final events of human history, or the ultimate destiny of humanity (societal collapse, human extinction, and so on).

== Religious apocalypticism ==
Religious views and movements often focus on cryptic revelations about a sudden, dramatic, and cataclysmic intervention of a god in human history; the judgment of humankind; the salvation of the faithful elect; and the eventual rule of the elect with the god in a heaven and/or upon a renewed Earth. Arising originally in Zoroastrianism, apocalypticism was developed more fully in the eschatological speculations of Judaism, Christianity, and Islam (the Abrahamic religions). Religious apocalypticism often involves themes such as God's judgment, salvation of the faithful, and the eventual establishment of a renewed world.

== Esoteric aspects ==
Apocalypticism is often conjoined with the belief that esoteric knowledge will likely be revealed in a major confrontation between good and evil forces, destined to change the course of history. Apocalypses can be viewed as good, evil, ambiguous or neutral, depending on the particular religion or belief system promoting them. However, it is not exclusively a religious idea and there are end times or transitional scenarios based in modern science, technology, political discourse, and conspiracy theories.

== Abrahamic religions ==
=== Christianity ===
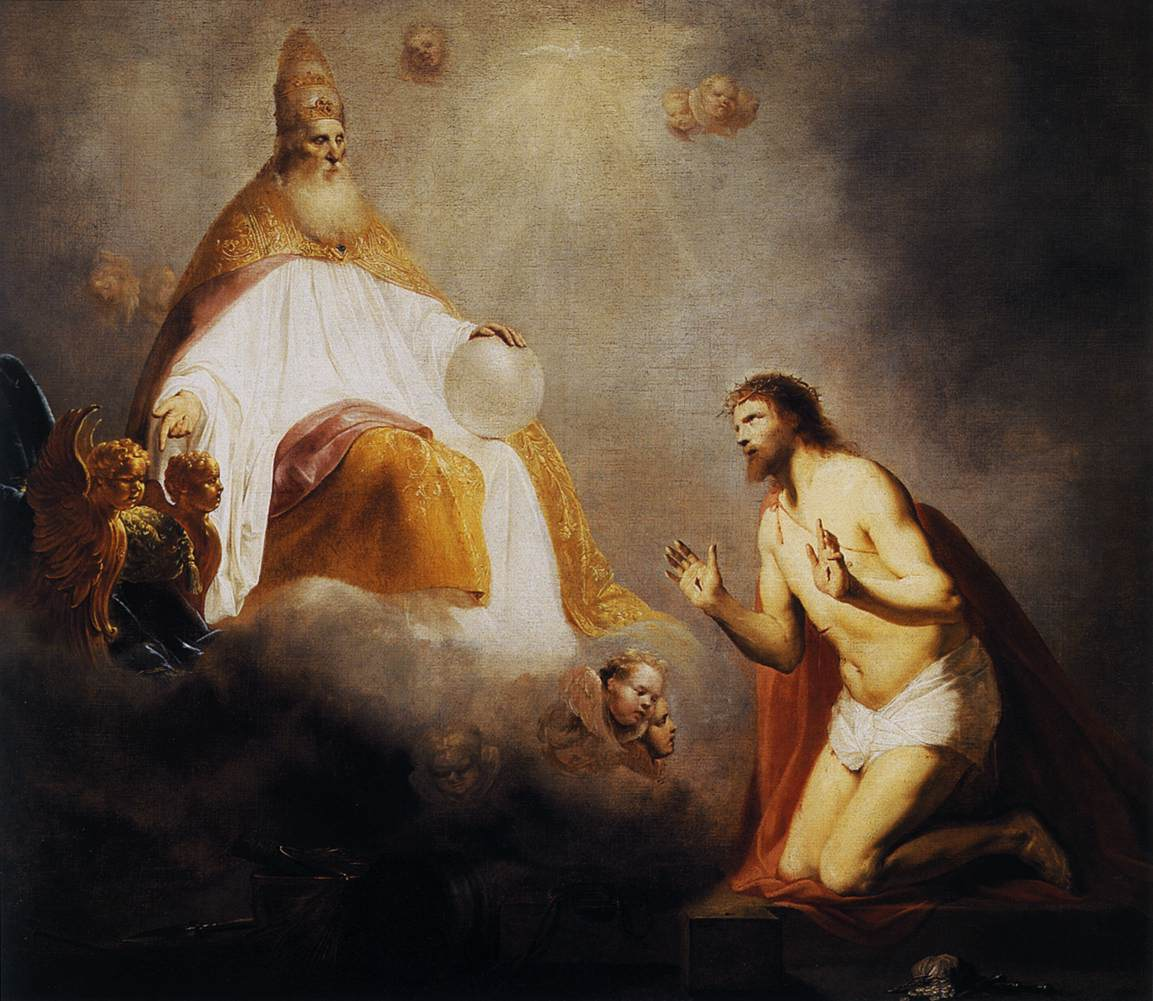
God Inviting Christ to Sit on the Throne at His Right Hand, painting by Pieter de Grebber (1645). The Holy Spirit is visible as a dove at the top of the image.

Most scholars participating in the third quest for the historical Jesus believe that Jesus was an eschatological prophet who believed the coming arrival of the "Kingdom of God". Simultaneously, some of these scholars tend to see Jesus's predictions as mistaken although many others view it from the perspective of the conditional nature of judgement prophecy. Dale Allison draws parallels from the history of religions and the historical Jesus showing that contingent eschatology is often used as a dissonance reduction strategy when certain expectations or prophecies fail to materialize. Others have insisted on a "realized eschatology" that says Jesus' own ministry fulfilled prophetic hopes. Many conservative scholars argue the kingdom of god is both "present" and "still to come" in biblical passages. Such scholars take Jesus' statements of an imminent end as referring to the fall of Jerusalem in 70 AD.A number of interpretations of the term "Kingdom of God" have thus appeared in its eschatological context, e.g., apocalyptic, realized or inaugurated eschatologies, yet no consensus has emerged among scholars. The focus for Jesus's eschatological teachings is the Olivet Discourse in the gospel of Mark and the teachings in Matthew 24:36–51. Many scholars point to Jesus' association with John the Baptist as confirmation for his apocalyptic intentions.

Malherbe writes that Paul the Apostle includes himself among those who will live to see the parousia in 1 Thessalonians 4:13–18 , although this is disputed by J. Andrew Doole. In contrast, other passages in the Pauline epistles such as Philippians 4:5 are seen as describing the nearness of the parousia even if Paul himself will not live to see it. (Note: However, these statements find tensions with other New Testament passages, conflicting with texts which form the basis for later Christian apocalyptic theology. This includes a passage from the apocalyptic discourse of Matthew 24, where Jesus states "only the Father" knows of the hour of the coming of the Son of Man. While later Christians favor Matthew 24 over Mark 13, modern critical scholars recognize this contradiction as evidence of shifting Christian belief. This is a shift that suggests the apocalyptic moment will occur at a later date, not in the lifetime of Jesus' followers.) On the other hand, N.T. Wright observes that Paul's eschatology develops in his later epistles, after turbulent experiences in Ephesus, that he would probably not see the Second Coming in his lifetime. Wright argues that this shift was due to perspective and not belief.

Most scholars of the mid-twentieth century and the third quest held to the view of a “consistent eschatology” where Jesus was an eschatological prophet who believed in a future coming of the “Kingdom of God". However, C. H. Dodd and others have insisted on a "realized eschatology", based on the belief that the ministry of Jesus had fulfilled prophetic hopes. Many conservative scholars have adopted the paradoxical position that the "Kingdom of God" describes a kingdom that is both "present" and "still to come", claiming Pauline eschatology as support. While the notion of an apocalyptic Jesus remains a mainstream view among scholars, it has been challenged by proponents of other portraits. Scholars of the Jesus Seminar have rejected the historicity of Jesus' apocalyptic expectations, arguing that the evidence for it in the Gospels is largely tied to the discourses of Jesus on the "Son of Man", which they do not consider to be historical; they further attribute the apocalyptic expectations of the early Church as emerging from their belief in the resurrection of Jesus, where resurrection was tied to eschatological expectations in Jewish theology. Some argued that the earlier traditions in the Q Source and Gospel of Thomas showed that apocalyptic eschatology was not present in earlier layers of the Jesus tradition. The approach by the Jesus Seminar is not short of many critics.

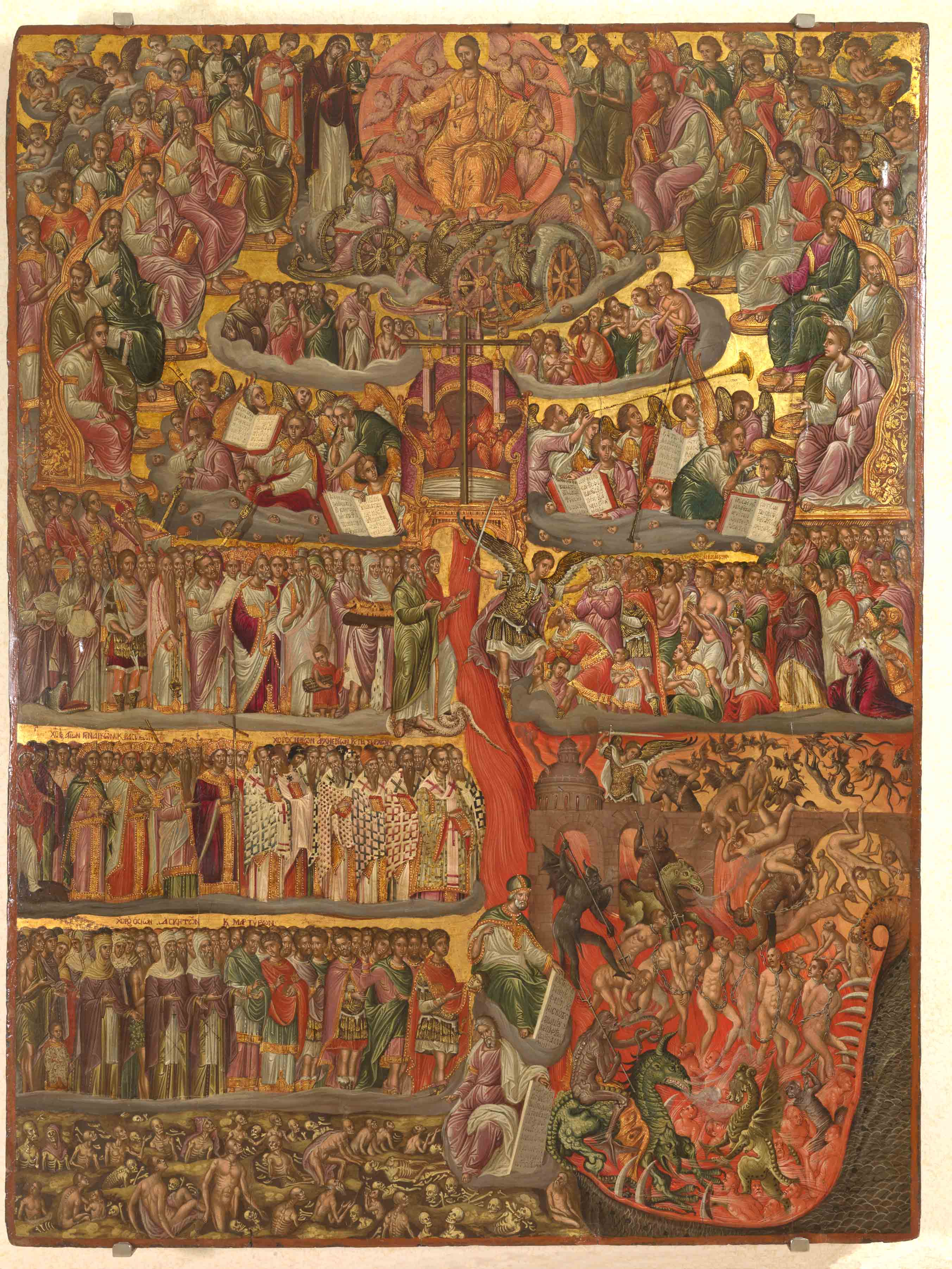
The Last Judgment, Eastern Orthodox icon on the Second Coming of Christ by Georgios Klontzas (c. 1580–1608), Hellenic Institute of Venice, Italy

Some scholars argue the apocalyptic ideas in the early Christian gospels are not to be viewed as a literal timetable or prediction of the end times, but as relating to the destruction of the Jewish Temple in 70 CE. They argue that for ancient Jews, the Temple was treated as a symbolic or even literal meeting point between Heaven and Earth, thereby its destruction would have wider cosmic consequences. Similarly, it is argued that apocalyptic language was used throughout the Hebrew Bible to describe political and historical catastrophes, and not the end of the world. Thus, scholars such as R.T. France and N.T. Wright argue that the Gospels use apocalyptic language borrowed from the Old Testament to describe the destruction of the Temple in 70 AD, and passages such as Mark 13:26 concerning the "coming" of the Son of Man (as described in Daniel 7) are not about the Second Coming, but rather about the vindication and enthronement of the Son of Man at the Right Hand of God, where he is bestowed new authority with the Temple's destruction. Similarly, these and other scholars argue for a "now and not yet" approach to the Kingdom of God in the Gospels and Pauline epistles.

Various Christian eschatological systems have developed among different Christian denominations throughout the history of Christianity, providing different frameworks for understanding the timing and nature of apocalyptic predictions. Some like dispensational premillennialism tend more toward an apocalyptic vision, while others like postmillennialism and amillennialism, while teaching that the end of the world could come at any moment, tend to focus on the present life and contend that one should not attempt to predict when the end should come, though there have been exceptions such as postmillennialist Jonathan Edwards, who estimated that the end times would occur around the year 2000.

==== Year 1000 ====
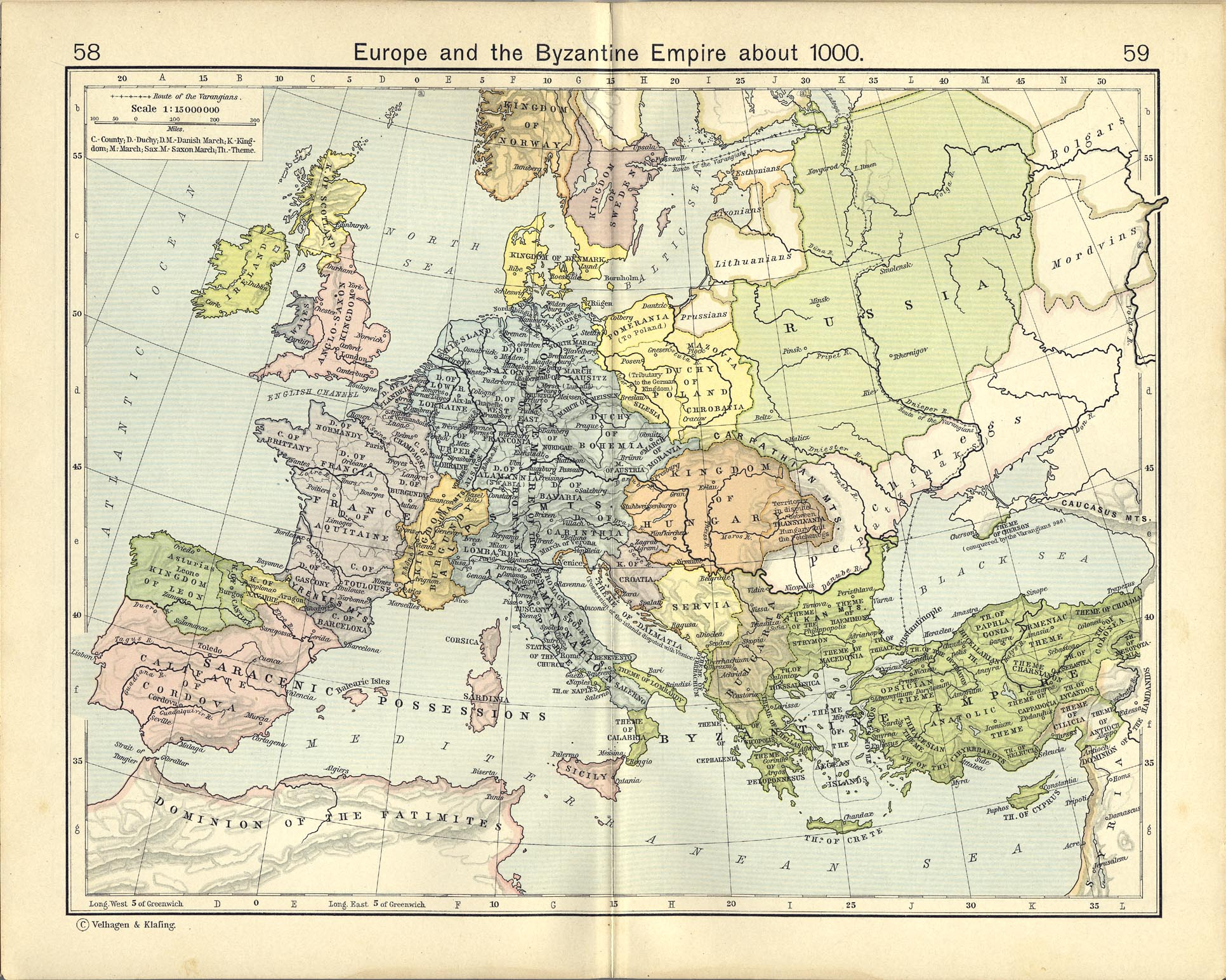
Western Europe, the Holy Roman Empire, Kievan Rus', and the Byzantine Empire in the Middle Ages (year 1000)

There is no current consensus among historians about widespread apocalypticism in the year 1000. Richard Landes, Johannes Fried, and others think there were widespread expectations, both hopes and fears. The notion of a widespread expectation of the year 1000 first appeared during the Renaissance. Historians denounced it as a myth around 1900.

There are many recorded instances of both fascination with the advent of the year 1000, and examples of apocalyptic excitement leading up to the year 1000, the most explicit and revealing examples provided by Rodulfus Glaber.

Specifically in Western Europe, during the year 1000, Christian philosophers held many debates on when Jesus was actually born and the debates continue to today. This caused confusion between the common people on whether or not the apocalypse would occur at a certain time. Because both literate and illiterate people commonly accepted this idea of the apocalypse, they could only accept what they heard from religious leaders on when the disastrous event would occur. Religious leader Abbo of Fleury believed that Jesus was born 21 years after year 1 which was commonly accepted by close circles of his followers. Abbot Heriger of Lobbes, argued that the birth of Jesus occurred not during the year 1 but rather during the 42nd year of the common era. Eventually many scholars came to accept that the apocalypse would occur sometime between 979 and 1042. Under the influence of the Sibylline Oracles and figures such as Otto III and Abbot Adso of Montier-en-Der many felt that the apocalypse would soon occur.

Some historians, such as Richard Landes, think there were extensive apocalyptic expectations at the approach of the year 1000 and again at the approach of 1000 anno passionis (1033). Alessandro Barbero, on the other hand, claims that the fear of the year 1000 is a myth and there was no widespread apocalyptic sentiment. As evidence, he cites that on 31 December 999 Pope Sylvester II granted certain privileges and guarantees to the Abbey of Fulda, without any indication that either the pope or the abbot believed that the world was soon to end. Similarly, Barbero points out a document from 3 October 999 in which Otto III grants future concessions to Farfa Abbey. Another document in 999 shows two brothers taking a 29-year loan on lands of the abbey of San Marciano in Tortona, suggesting that even common people did not believe the world was ending. On the other hand, the fact that Otto III visited the tomb of Charlemagne, the emperor of the year 6000 (Annus Mundi) on Pentecost of the year 1000 suggests that even the man who appointed Sylvester pope, had his own views on the matter.

==== Crusades ====
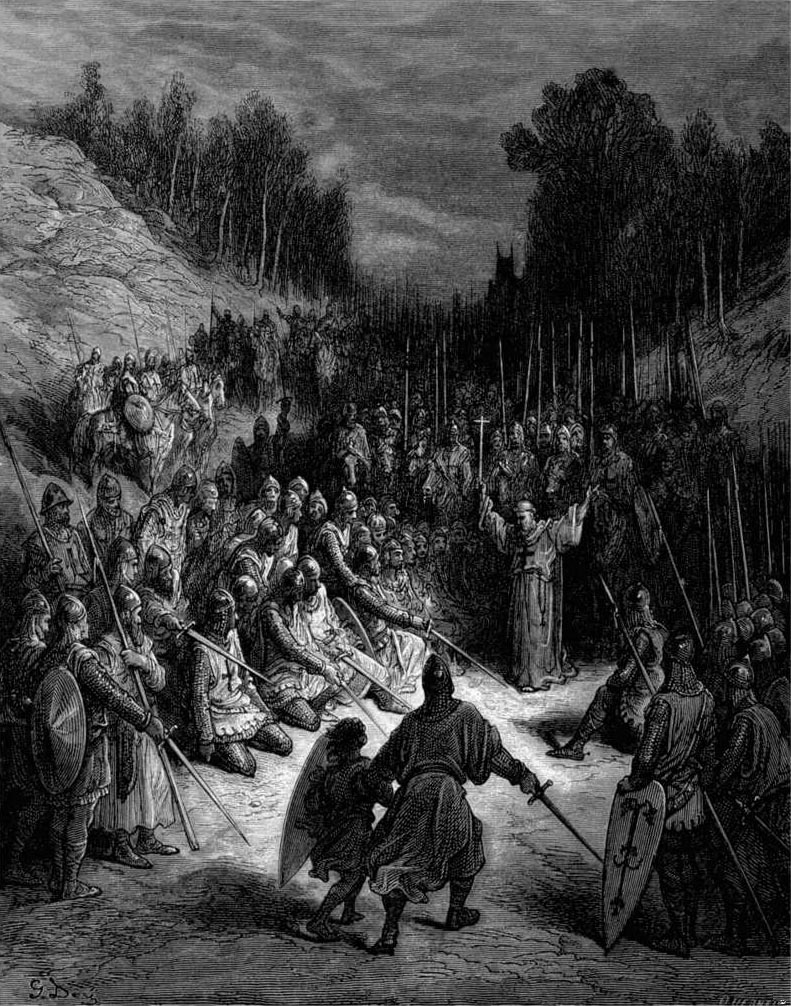
Peter the Hermit preaching the Crusade, Gustave Doré

From the outset, the Crusades were filled with apocalyptic expectation and prophecy, beginning with the preachings of figures like Peter the Hermit to inspire knights, nobles, and commoners to march to the Holy Land and take Jerusalem. Other leading figures of the People's Crusade, such as Volkmar and Emicho, were so filled with zealotry that they slaughtered Jewish inhabitants along their journey to the Levant. Emicho claimed that Christ appeared and ordered him to fulfill apocalyptic prophecy by marching on Constantinople, seizing Jerusalem, triggering the Second Coming, and beginning the end times struggle against the Antichrist. Leaders of the following Prince's Crusade, such as Raymond of Aguilers, understood their conquest of Jerusalem as being a victory of Christendom over the Saracen "pagans" and as a sign of the oncoming Apocalypse and Second Coming.

Christian chroniclers, such as Matthew of Edessa, illustrated the Crusades in an apocalyptic framework, connecting the Frankish rule with the fourth kingdom in Daniel's prophecy. Many other European writers emphasized the bloodiness during the massacre of Jerusalem as fulfilling the violent prophecies of Revelation. Muslim scholars reacted to the success of the First Crusade with less apocalyptic interpretation, instead perceiving it as more of a tragedy of history. Joachim of Fiore and other millenarian thinkers perceived saw the Crusades as temporary, foreseeing the voluntarily conversion of the Islamic world over time.

==== Fifth Monarchy Men ====
The Fifth Monarchists or Fifth Monarchy Men were an extreme Puritan sect active from 1649 to 1660 during the Interregnum, following the English Civil Wars of the 17th century. They took their name from a prophecy in the Book of Daniel that four ancient monarchies (Babylonian, Persian, Macedonian, and Roman) would precede the kingdom of Christ. They also referred to the year 1666 and its relationship to the biblical Number of the Beast indicating the end of earthly rule by carnal human beings. They were one of a number of nonconformist dissenting groups that emerged around this time.

==== Isaac Newton and the end of the world in 2060 ====
In late February and early March 2003, a large amount of media attention circulated around the globe regarding largely unknown and unpublished documents, evidently written by Isaac Newton, indicating that he believed the world would end no earlier than 2060. The story garnered vast amounts of public interest and found its way onto the front page of several widely distributed newspapers, including the UK's The Daily Telegraph, Canada's National Post, and Israel's Maariv and Yediot Aharonot, and was also featured in an article in the scientific journal Canadian Journal of History.

The two documents detailing this prediction are currently housed within the Jewish National and University Library in Jerusalem. Both were believed to be written toward the end of Newton's life, circa 1705, a time frame most notably established by the use of the full title of Sir Isaac Newton within portions of the documents.

These documents do not appear to have been written with the intention of publication and Newton expressed a strong personal dislike for individuals who provided specific dates for the Apocalypse purely for sensational value. Furthermore, he at no time provides a specific date for the end of the world in either of these documents. See Isaac Newton's religious views for more details.

The first document, part of the Yahuda collection, is a small letter slip, on the back of which is written haphazardly in Newton's hand:

Prop. 1. The 2300 prophetick days did not commence before the rise of the little horn of the He Goat.

2 Those day [sic] did not commence a[f]ter the destruction of Jerusalem & ye Temple by the Romans A.[D.] 70.

3 The time times & half a time did not commence before the year 800 in wch the Popes supremacy commenced

4 They did not commence after the re[ig]ne of Gregory the 7th. 1084

5 The 1290 days did not commence b[e]fore the year 842.

6 They did not commence after the reigne of Pope Greg. 7th. 1084

7 The diffence [sic] between the 1290 & 1335 days are a parts of the seven weeks.

Therefore the 2300 years do not end before ye year 2132 nor after 2370. The time times & half time do n[o]t end before 2060 nor after [2344] The 1290 days do not begin [this should read: end] before 2090 nor after 1374 [sic; Newton probably means 2374]

The second reference to the 2060 prediction can be found in a folio, in which Newton writes:

So then the time times & half a time are 42 months or 1260 days or three years & an half, recconing twelve months to a yeare & 30 days to a month as was done in the Calendar of the primitive year. And the days of short lived Beasts being put for the years of lived [sic for "long lived"] kingdoms, the period of 1260 days, if dated from the complete conquest of the three kings A.C. 800, will end A.C. 2060. It may end later, but I see no reason for its ending sooner. This I mention not to assert when the time of the end shall be, but to put a stop to the rash conjectures of fancifull men who are frequently predicting the time of the end, & by doing so bring the sacred prophesies into discredit as often as their predictions fail. Christ comes as a thief in the night, & it is not for us to know the times & seasons wch God hath put into his own breast.

Newton may not have been referring to the post 2060 event as a destructive act resulting in the annihilation of the globe and its inhabitants, but rather one in which he believed the world, as he saw it, was to be replaced with a new one based upon a transition to an era of divinely inspired peace. In Christian and Islamic theology this concept is often referred to as The Second Coming of Jesus Christ and the establishment of the Kingdom of God on Earth. In a separate manuscript, Isaac Newton paraphrases Revelation 21 and 22 and relates the post 2060 events by writing:

A new heaven & new earth. New Jerusalem comes down from heaven prepared as a Bride adorned for her husband. The marriage supper. God dwells with men wipes away all tears from their eyes, gives them of ye fountain of living water & creates all thin things new saying, It is done. The glory & felicity of the New Jerusalem is represented by a building of Gold & Gemms enlightened by the glory of God & ye Lamb & watered by ye river of Paradise on ye banks of which grows the tree of life. Into this city the kings of the earth do bring their glory & that of the nations & the saints reign for ever & ever.

==== Millerism and The Great Disappointment ====
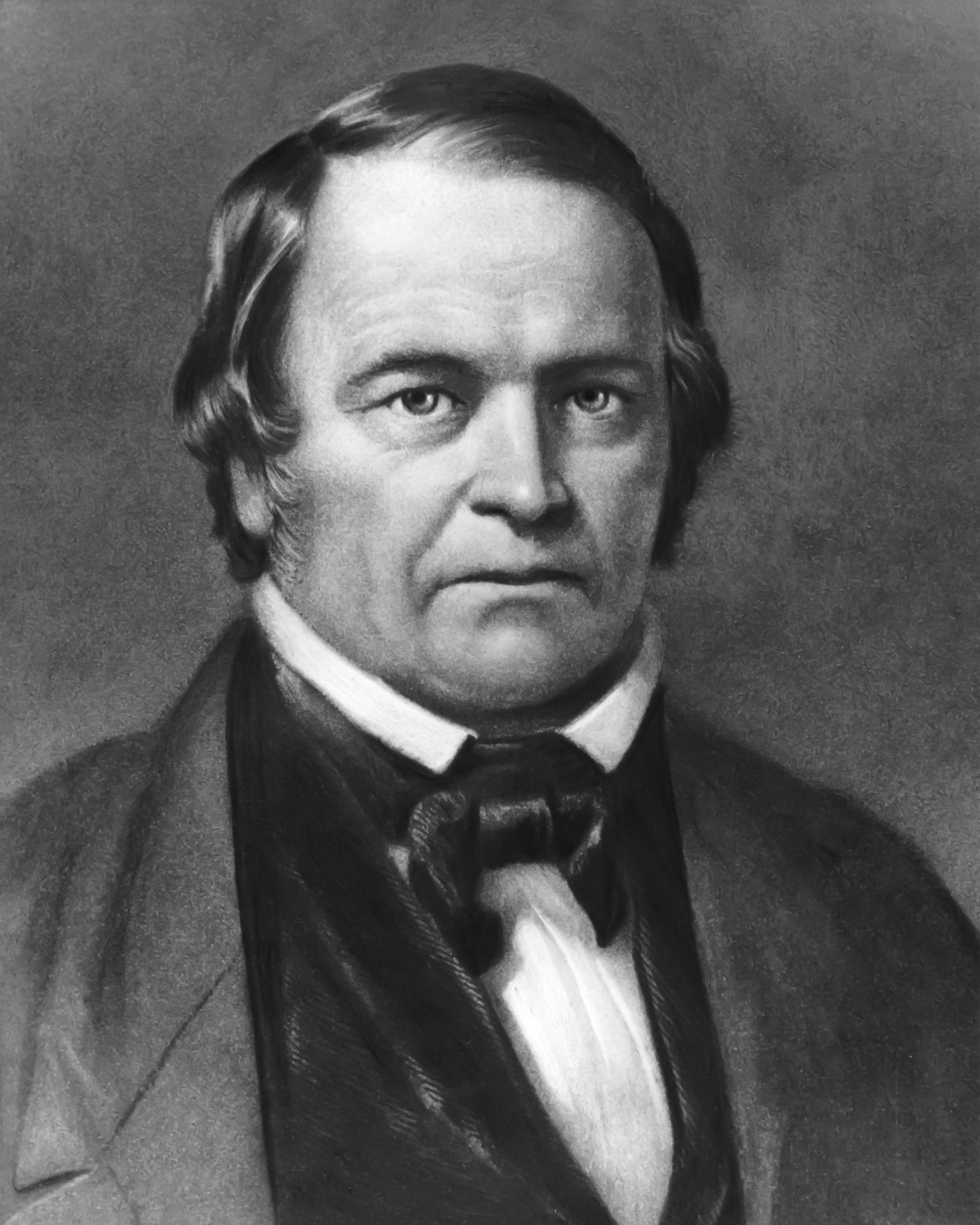
Preacher William Miller, who led his followers to the Great Disappointment of 1844

The Great Disappointment in the Millerite movement was the reaction that followed Baptist preacher William Miller's proclamations that Jesus Christ would return to the Earth by 1844, what he called the Advent. His study of the Daniel 8 prophecy during the Second Great Awakening led him to the conclusion that Daniel's "cleansing of the sanctuary" was cleansing of the world from sin when Christ would come, and he and many others prepared, but October 22, 1844 came and they were disappointed.

These events paved the way for the Adventists who formed the Seventh-day Adventist Church. They contended that what had happened on October 22 was not Jesus's return, as Miller had thought, but the start of Jesus's final work of atonement, the cleansing in the heavenly sanctuary, leading up to the Second Coming of Christ.

==== Seventh-day Adventism ====
The ideological descendants of the Millerites are the Seventh-day Adventists. They are a Protestant Christian denomination which is distinguished by its observance of Saturday, the seventh day of the week in both the Jewish calendar, and calendars in use in the Christian world (such as the Gregorian calendar), as the Sabbath, and its emphasis on the imminent Second Coming (advent) of Jesus Christ. The denomination grew out of the Millerite movement in the United States during the mid-19th century and it was formally established in 1863. Among its founders was Ellen G. White, whose extensive writings are still held in high regard by the adherents of the Seventh-day Adventist Church.

==== Mormonism ====
Like many 19th-century American Restorationist Christian denominations, the Mormon tradition teaches that adherents are living shortly before the Second Coming of Christ. The term "latter days" is used in the official names of several Mormon churches, including the Church of Jesus Christ of Latter-day Saints. LDS president Wilford Woodruff preached multiple times that many then-living adherents "would not taste death" before witnessing the return of Christ. According to LDS Church teachings, the true gospel will be taught in all parts of the world prior to the Second Coming. Church members believe that there will be increasingly severe wars, earthquakes, hurricanes, and other man-made and natural disasters prior to the Second Coming.

==== Jehovah's Witnesses ====
The eschatology of Jehovah's Witnesses is central to their faith and religious beliefs. They believe that Jesus Christ has been ruling in heaven as king since 1914 (a date they believe was prophesied in Scripture), and that after that time a period of cleansing occurred, resulting in God's selection of the Bible Students associated with Charles Taze Russell to be his people in 1919. They also believe the destruction of those who reject their message and thus willfully refuse to obey God will shortly take place at Armageddon, ensuring that the beginning of the new earthly society will be composed of willing subjects of that kingdom.

The group's doctrines surrounding 1914 are the legacy of a series of emphatic claims regarding the years 1799, 1874, 1878, 1914, 1918 and 1925 made in the Watch Tower Society's publications between 1879 and 1924. Claims about the significance of those years, including the presence of Jesus Christ, the beginning of the "last days", the destruction of worldly governments and the earthly resurrection of Jewish patriarchs, were successively abandoned. In 1922 the society's principal journal, Watch Tower, described its chronology as "no stronger than its weakest link", but also claimed the chronological relationships to be "of divine origin and divinely corroborated...in a class by itself, absolutely and unqualifiedly correct" and "indisputable facts", while repudiation of Russell's teachings was described as "equivalent to a repudiation of the Lord".

The Watch Tower Society has stated that its early leaders promoted "incomplete, even inaccurate concepts". The Governing Body of Jehovah's Witnesses says that, unlike Old Testament prophets, its interpretations of the Bible are not inspired or infallible. Witness publications say that Bible prophecies can be fully understood only after their fulfillment, citing examples of biblical figures who did not understand the meaning of prophecies they received. Watch Tower publications often cite Proverbs 4:18, "The path of the righteous ones is like the bright light that is getting lighter and lighter until the day is firmly established" (NWT) to support their view that there would be an increase in knowledge during "the time of the end", as mentioned in Daniel 12:4. Jehovah's Witnesses state that this increase in knowledge needs adjustments. Watch Tower publications also say that unfulfilled expectations are partly due to eagerness for God's Kingdom and that they do not call their core beliefs into question.

==== Christadelphians ====
For Christadelphians, Armageddon marks the "great climax of history when the nations would be gathered together "into a place called in the Hebrew tongue Armageddon", and the judgment on them would herald the setting up of the Kingdom of God." After this Christadelphians believe that Jesus will return to the earth in person to set up the Kingdom of God in fulfilment of the promises made to Abraham and David. This includes the belief that the coming Kingdom will be the restoration of God's first Kingdom of Israel, which was under David and Solomon. For Christadelphians, this is the focal point of the gospel taught by Jesus and the apostles.

==== Realized eschatology ====
Realized eschatology is a Christian eschatological theory popularized by J. A. T. Robinson, Joachim Jeremias, Ethelbert Stauffer (1902–1979), and C. H. Dodd (1884–1973), that holds that the eschatological passages in the New Testament do not refer to the future, but instead refer to the ministry of Jesus and his lasting legacy. Eschatology is therefore not the end of the world but its rebirth instituted by Jesus and continued by his disciples, a historical (rather than transhistorical) phenomenon. Those holding this view generally dismiss end times theories, believing them to be irrelevant; they hold that what Jesus said and did, and told his disciples to do likewise, are of greater significance than any messianic expectations.

==== Harold Camping ====
American Christian radio host Harold Camping stated that the Rapture and Judgment Day would take place on May 21, 2011, and that the end of the world would take place five months later on October 21, 2011, based on adding the 153 fish of John 20 to May 21. The Rapture, as indicated in 1 Thessalonians 4:17 (harpagēsometha 'we shall be raptured/taken up', rapture derivable from the Latin translation rapiemur) is the taking up of believers to a meeting in the air with the Lord Jesus, but for Camping the rapture was also associated with the End of the World.

Camping, who was then president of the Family Radio Christian network, claimed the Bible as his source and said May 21 would be the date of the Rapture and the day of judgment "beyond the shadow of a doubt". Camping suggested that it would occur at 6 pm local time, with the Rapture sweeping the globe time zone by time zone, while some of his supporters claimed that around 200 million people (approximately 3% of the world's population) would be raptured. Camping had previously claimed that the Rapture would occur in September 1994.

The vast majority of Christian groups, including most Protestant and Catholic believers, did not accept Camping's predictions; some explicitly rejected them, citing Bible passages including the words of Jesus stating "about that day or hour no one knows" (Matthew 24:36). An interview with a group of church leaders noted that all of them had scheduled church services as usual for Sunday, May 22.

Following the failure of the prediction, media attention shifted to the response from Camping and his followers. On May 23, Camping stated that May 21 had been a "spiritual" day of judgment, and that the physical Rapture would occur on October 21, 2011, simultaneously with the destruction of the universe by God. However, on October 16, Camping admitted to an interviewer that he did not know when the end would come.

In March 2012, Camping "humbly acknowledged" in a letter to Family Radio listeners that he had been mistaken, that the attempt to predict a date was "sinful", and that critics had been right in pointing to the scriptural text "of that day and hour knoweth no man". He added that he was searching the Bible "even more fervently [...] not to find dates, but to be more faithful in our understanding."

==== David Meade ====
David Meade is the pen name of an American end-times conspiracy theorist and book author who has yet to disclose his real name. Meade, who describes himself as a "Christian numerologist", claims to have attended the University of Louisville, where he "studied astronomy, among other subjects", but, because his real name is unknown, The Washington Post reported that the university could not confirm whether he had ever been a student there. He is also a writer, researcher and investigator who has written and self-published at least 13 books. He made appearances and interviews on Coast to Coast AM, The Washington Post, Glenn Beck Program, YouTube with pastor Paul Begley, and the Daily Express. He is best known for making numerous predictions, which have passed, regarding the end times, including that a hidden planet named Nibiru (sometimes known as Planet X) would destroy the Earth.

Meade predicted that planet Nibiru would collide with Earth on September 23, 2017, destroying it. After his prediction failed, he revised the apocalypse to October, where he stated that the seven-year tribulation would possibly start followed by a millennium of peace. In 2018, Meade again made several predictions for that year, for instance, that North Korea becoming a superpower in March 2018 and that Nibiru would destroy the Earth in spring. Meade announced that the apocalypse would begin in March 2018, but he did not predict the exact date. After March 2018 passed, he moved the apocalypse to April 23, 2018, in which he also predicted the Sun, Moon, Jupiter, and Virgo will signal the rapture, and that Nibiru would destroy the Earth that day. However, before that date he said that reports that he predicted the end on 23 April were "fake news", but that the rapture—but not the end of the world—would take place on an unspecified date between May and December 2018.

==== Branch Davidians ====
The Branch Davidians (also known as The Branch) are a religious group that originated in 1955 from a schism among the Shepherd's Rod/Davidians. The Branch group was initially led by Benjamin Roden. Branch Davidians are most associated with the Waco siege of 1993, which involved David Koresh. There is documented evidence (FBI negotiation transcripts between Kathryn Shroeder and Steve Schneider with interjections from Koresh himself) that David Koresh and his followers did not call themselves Branch Davidians. In addition, David Koresh, through forgery, stole the identity of the Branch Davidian Seventh-day Adventists for the purpose of obtaining the Mount Carmel Center property. The doctrinal beliefs of the Branch Davidians differ on teachings such as the Holy Spirit and his nature, and the feast days and their requirements. Both groups have disputed the relevance of the other's spiritual authority based on the proceedings following Victor Houteff's death. From its inception in 1930, the Davidians/Shepherd's Rod group believed themselves to be living in a time when biblical prophecies of a final divine judgment were coming to pass as a prelude to Christ's Second Coming.

In the late 1980s, Koresh and his followers abandoned many Branch Davidian teachings. Koresh became the group's self-proclaimed final prophet. "Koreshians" were the majority resulting from the schism among the Branch Davidians, but some of the Branch Davidians did not join Koresh's group and instead gathered around George Roden or became independent. Following a series of violent shootouts between Roden's and Koresh's group, the Mount Carmel compound was eventually taken over by the "Koreshians". In 1993, the ATF and Texas Army National Guard raided one of the properties belonging to a new religious movement centered around David Koresh that evolved from the Branch Davidians for suspected weapons violations. It is unknown who shot first, but the ATF surrounded and tried to invade the home of the Branch Davidians. This raid resulted in a two-hour firefight in which four ATF agents were killed; this was followed by a standoff with government agents that lasted for 51 days. The siege ended in a fire that engulfed the Mount Carmel compound which led to the deaths of 76 Branch Davidians inside.

=== Islam ===
Islamic eschatology is the aspect of Islamic theology concerning ideas of life after death, matters of the soul, and the "Day of Judgement," known as Yawm al-Qiyāmah (Arabic: يوم القيامة, IPA: [jawmu‿l.qijaːma], "the Day of Resurrection") or Yawm ad-Dīn (يوم الدين, Arabic pronunciation: [jawmu‿d.diːn], "the Day of Judgment"). The Day of Judgement is characterized by the annihilation of all life, which will then be followed by the resurrection of the dead and judgment by God. It is not specified when al-Qiyamah will happen, but according to prophecy elaborated by hadith literature, there are major and minor signs that will foretell its coming. Multiple verses in the Qur'an mention the Last Judgment.

The main subject of Surat al-Qiyama is the resurrection. The Great Tribulation is described in the hadith and commentaries of the ulama, including al-Ghazali, Ibn Kathir, Ibn Majah, Muhammad al-Bukhari, and Ibn Khuzaymah. The Day of Judgment is also known as the Day of Reckoning, the Last Day, and the Hour (al-sā'ah).

Unlike the Quran, the hadith contains several events, happening before the Day of Judgment, which are described as several minor signs and twelve major signs. During this period, terrible corruption and chaos would rule the earth, caused by the Masih ad-Dajjal (the Antichrist in Islam), then Jesus will appear, defeating the Dajjal and establish a period of peace, liberating the world from cruelty. These events will be followed by a time of serenity when people live according to religious values.

Similarly to other Abrahamic religions, Islam teaches that there will be a resurrection of the dead that will be followed by a final tribulation and eternal division of the righteous and wicked. Islamic apocalyptic literature describing Armageddon is often known as fitna, Al-Malhama Al-Kubra (The Great Massacre) or ghaybah in Shī'a Islam. The righteous are rewarded with the pleasures of Jannah (Paradise), while the unrighteous are punished in Jahannam (Hell).

=== Judaism ===
Moses of Crete, a rabbi in the 5th century, claimed to be the Jewish Messiah and promised to lead the people, like the ancient Moses, through a parted sea back to Palestine. His followers left their possessions and waited for the promised day, when, at his command, many cast themselves into the sea, some finding death, others being rescued by sailors.

== Ancient Norse religion ==
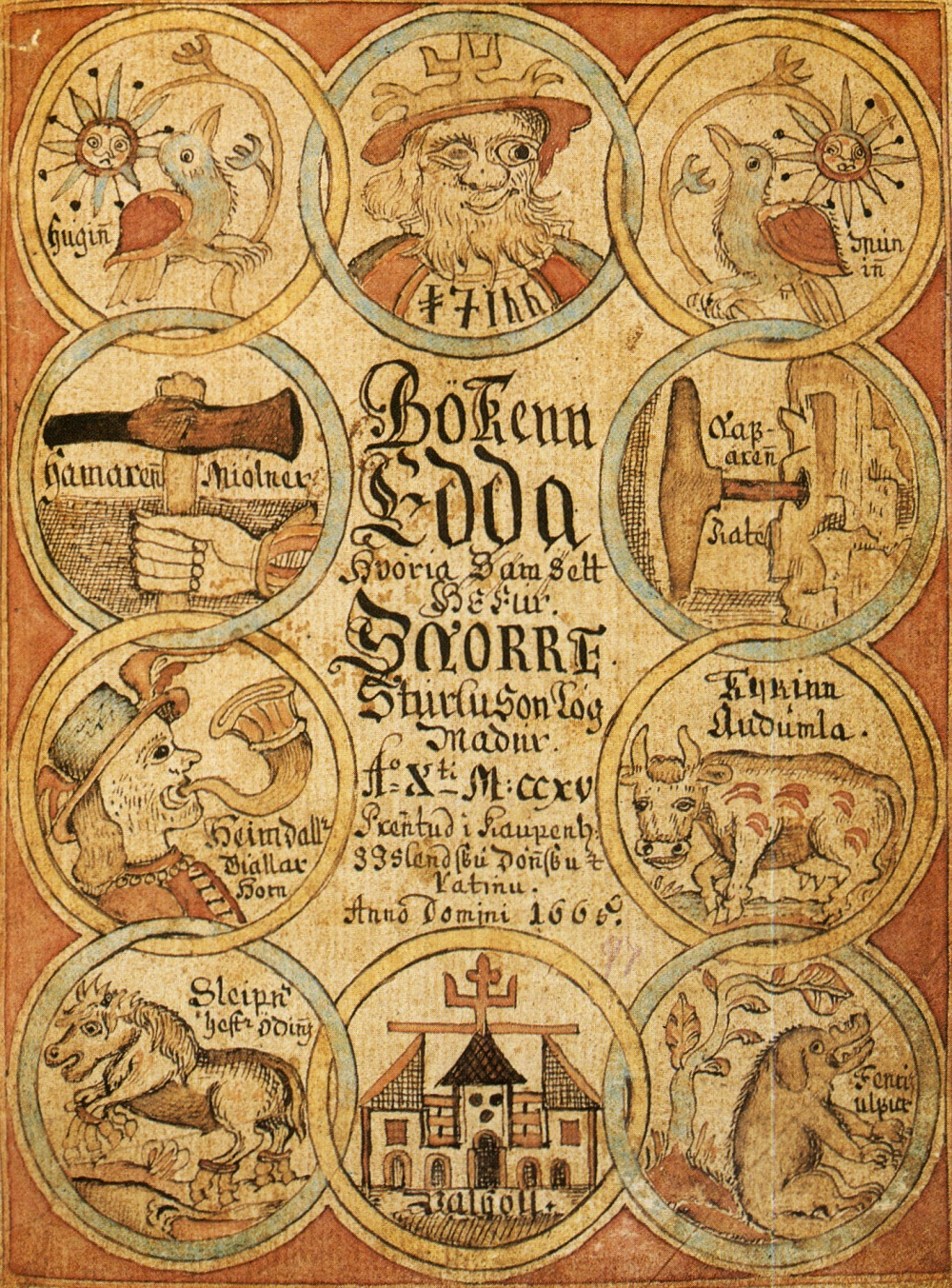
Title page of a late manuscript of the Prose Edda written by Snorri Sturluson (13th century), showing the Ancient Norse Gods Odin, Heimdallr, Sleipnir, and other figures from Norse mythology

Ragnarök is an important eschatological event in the Ancient Norse religion and its mythology, and has been the subject of scholarly discourse and theory in the history of Germanic studies and is attested primarily in the Poetic Edda, compiled in the 13th century from earlier traditional sources and the Prose Edda, composed in the 13th century by the Icelandic scholar, lawspeaker, and historian Snorri Sturluson. In the Prose Edda and in a single poem in the Poetic Edda, the event is referred to as Ragnarök or Ragnarøkkr (Old Norse for 'Fate of the Gods' / 'Twilight of the Gods', respectively), a usage popularised by 19th-century composer Richard Wagner with the title of the last of his Der Ring des Nibelungen operas, Götterdämmerung (1876), which is "Twilight of the Gods" in German. There are various theories and interpretations of Ragnarök.

=== Cyclic time and Hoddmímis holt ===
Rudolf Simek theorizes that the survival of Líf and Lífþrasir at the end of Ragnarök is "a case of reduplication of the anthropogeny, understandable from the cyclic nature of the Eddic eschatology". Simek says that Hoddmímis holt "should not be understood literally as a wood or even a forest in which the two keep themselves hidden, but rather as an alternative name for the world-tree Yggdrasill. Thus, the creation of mankind from tree trunks (Askr, Embla) is repeated after the Ragnarök as well". Simek says that in Germanic regions, the concept of mankind originating from trees is ancient, and additionally points out legendary parallels in a Bavarian legend of a shepherd who lives inside a tree, whose descendants repopulate the land after life there has been wiped out by plague (citing a retelling by F. R. Schröder). In addition, Simek points to an Old Norse parallel in the figure of Örvar-Oddr, "who is rejuvenated after living as a tree-man (Ǫrvar-Odds saga 24–27)".

=== Muspille, Heliand, and Christianity ===
Theories have been proposed about the relation between Ragnarök and the 9th-century Old High German epic poem Muspilli about the Christian Last Judgment, where the word Muspille appears, and the 9th-century Old Saxon epic poem Heliand about the life of Christ, where various other forms of the word appear. In both sources, the word is used to signify the end of the world through fire. Old Norse forms of the term also appear throughout accounts of Ragnarök, where the world is also consumed in flames, and, though various theories exist about the meaning and origins of the term, its etymology has not been solved.

=== Proto-Indo-European basis ===
Parallels have been pointed out between the Ragnarök of Norse religion and the beliefs of other related Proto-Indo-European peoples. Subsequently, theories have been put forth that Ragnarök represents a later evolution of a Proto-Indo-European belief along with other cultures descending from the Proto-Indo-Europeans. These parallels include comparisons of a cosmic winter motif between the Norse Fimbulwinter, the Iranian Bundahishn and Yima. Víðarr's stride has been compared to the Vedic god Vishnu in that both have a "cosmic stride" with a special shoe used to tear apart a beastly wolf. Larger patterns have also been drawn between "final battle" events in Indo-European cultures, including the occurrence of a blind or semi-blind figure in "final battle" themes, and figures appearing suddenly with surprising skills.

=== Volcanic eruptions ===
Hilda Ellis Davidson theorizes that the events in Völuspá occurring after the death of the gods (the sun turning black, steam rising, flames touching the heavens, etc.) may be inspired by the volcanic eruptions on Iceland. Records of eruptions on Iceland bear strong similarities to the sequence of events described in Völuspá, especially the eruption at Laki that occurred in 1783. Bertha Phillpotts theorizes that the figure of Surtr was inspired by Icelandic eruptions, and that he was a volcano demon. Surtr's name occurs in some Icelandic place names, among them the lava tube Surtshellir, a number of dark caverns in the volcanic central region of Iceland.

=== Bergbúa þáttr ===
Parallels have been pointed out between a poem spoken by a jötunn found in the 13th-century þáttr Bergbúa þáttr ("the tale of the mountain dweller"). In the tale, Thórd and his servant get lost while traveling to church in winter, and so take shelter for the night within a cave. Inside the cave they hear noises, witness a pair of immense burning eyes, and then the being with burning eyes recites a poem of 12 stanzas. The poem the being recites contains references to Norse mythology (including a mention of Thor) and also prophecies (including that "mountains will tumble, the earth will move, men will be scoured by hot water and burned by fire"). Surtr's fire receives a mention in stanza 10. John Lindow says that the poem may describe "a mix of the destruction of the race of giants and of humans, as in Ragnarök" but that "many of the predictions of disruption on earth could also fit the volcanic activity that is so common in Iceland."

=== Modern influences ===
In late 2013 and early 2014, English-language media outlets widely reported that Ragnarök was foretold to occur on 22 February 2014. Apparently patterned after the 2012 phenomenon, the claim was at times attributed to a "Viking Calendar". No such calendar is known to have existed, and the source was a "prediction" made to media outlets by the Jorvik Viking Centre in York, England, intended to draw attention to an event that the institution was to hold on that date. The Jorvik Viking Centre was criticized for misleading the public to promote the event. In a 2014 article on the claims, philologist Joseph S. Hopkins perceives the media response as an example of a broad revival of interest in the Viking Age and ancient Germanic topics.

== Mayan calendar and the year 2012 ==
The 2012 phenomenon was a range of eschatological beliefs that cataclysmic or otherwise transformative events would occur on or around 21 December 2012. This date was regarded as the end-date of a 5,126-year-long cycle in the Mesoamerican Long Count calendar, and as such, festivities to commemorate the date took place on 21 December 2012 in the countries that were part of the Maya civilization (Mexico, Guatemala, Honduras, and El Salvador), with main events at Chichén Itzá in Mexico, and Tikal in Guatemala.

Various astronomical alignments and numerological formulae were proposed as pertaining to this date. A New Age interpretation held that the date marked the start of a period during which Earth and its inhabitants would undergo a positive physical or spiritual transformation, and that 21 December 2012 would mark the beginning of a new era. Others suggested that the date marked the end of the world or a similar catastrophe. Scenarios suggested for the end of the world included the arrival of the next solar maximum, an interaction between Earth and the supermassive black hole at the center of the galaxy, or Earth's collision with a mythical planet called Nibiru.

Scholars from various disciplines quickly dismissed predictions of concomitant cataclysmic events as they arose. Professional Mayanist scholars stated that no extant classic Maya accounts forecast impending doom, and that the idea that the Long Count calendar ends in 2012 misrepresented Maya history and culture, while astronomers rejected the various proposed doomsday scenarios as pseudoscience, easily refuted by elementary astronomical observations.

== UFO religions ==
UFO religions sometimes feature an anticipated end-time scenario in which extraterrestrial beings will bring about a radical change on Earth and/or "lift" the religious believers to a higher plane of existence. One such religious group's failed expectations of such an event, the Seekers, served as the basis for the classic social psychology research on cognitive dissonance conducted by the American psychologists Leon Festinger, Henry Riecken, and Stanley Schachter and published in their book When Prophecy Fails: A Social and Psychological Study of a Modern Group That Predicted the Destruction of the World (1956). Some adherents of UFO religions believe that the arrival or rediscovery of alien civilizations, technologies, and spirituality will enable human beings to overcome current ecological, spiritual, political, and social problems on planet Earth. Issues such as hatred, war, bigotry, poverty, and so on are said to be resolvable through the use of superior alien technology and spiritual abilities. Such belief systems are also described as millenarian in their outlook. In the late 1990s, religious scholar Andreas Grünschloß applied the term "cargoism" to adherents of UFO religions regarding their millenarian beliefs about the arrival of intelligent aliens on technologically advanced spacecrafts on planet Earth, in comparison to the Melanesian islanders's faith in the return of John Frum carrying the cargo with him on the islands.

== Zoroastrianism ==
The Zoroastrian eschatological ideas are only alluded to in the surviving texts of the Avesta, and are known of in detail only from the texts of Zoroastrian tradition, in particular in the 9th-century text Bundahishn. The accompanying story, as it appears in the Bundahishn (GBd 30.1ff), runs as follows: At the end of the "third time" (the first being the age of creation, the second of mixture, and the third of separation), there will be a great battle between the forces of good (yazata) and those of evil (daeva), in which the good will triumph. On Earth, the Saoshyant will bring about a resurrection of the dead in the bodies they had before they died. This is followed by a last judgment through ordeal. The yazata Airyaman and Atar will melt the metal in the hills and mountains, and the molten metal will then flow across the earth like a river. All mankind—both the living and the resurrected dead—will be required to wade through that river, but for the righteous (ashavan) it will seem to be a river of warm milk, while the wicked will be burned. The river will then flow down to hell, where it will annihilate Angra Mainyu and the last vestiges of wickedness in the universe.

The narrative continues with a projection of Ahura Mazda and the six Amesha Spentas solemnizing a final act of worship (yasna), and the preparation of parahaoma from "white haoma". The righteous will partake of the parahaoma, which will confer immortality upon them. Thereafter, humankind will become like the Amesha Spentas, living without food, without hunger or thirst, and without weapons (or possibility of bodily injury). The material substance of the bodies will be so light as to cast no shadow. All humanity will speak a single language and belong to a single nation without borders. All will share a single purpose and goal, joining with the divine for a perpetual exaltation of God's glory.

Although frashokereti is a restoration of the time of creation, there is no return to the uniqueness of the primordial plant, animal and human; while in the beginning there was one plant, one animal and one human, the variety that had since issued would remain forever. Similarly, the host of divinities brought into existence by Ahura Mazda continue to have distinct existences, "and there is no prophecy of their re-absorption into the Godhead".

== See also ==
- 1975 in Prophecy!
- Anti-nuclear movement
- Antichrist
- Apocalyptic and post-apocalyptic fiction
- Apocalyptic literature
  - Apocalypse of Abraham
  - Apocalypse of Paul
  - Apocalypse of Peter
  - Apocalypse of Pseudo-Ezra
  - Apocalypse of Pseudo-Methodius
  - Apocalypse of Zerubbabel
- Climate apocalypse
- Cult
  - Anti-cult movement
  - Christian countercult movement
  - Doomsday cult
  - New religious movement
- Dark forest hypothesis
- Dispensationalism
- Divine retribution
- Essenes
- Global catastrophic risk
- Gog and Magog
- Just-world fallacy
- List of dates predicted for apocalyptic events
- List of messiah claimants
- List of people claimed to be Jesus
- Mutual assured destruction
- Order of the Solar Temple
- Peoples Temple
- Premillennialism
- Preterism
- Preppers
- Sabbateans
- Singularitarianism
- Ultimate fate of the Universe
- Unfulfilled Christian religious predictions
- When Prophecy Fails
- White Minaret
