= Dorothy Martin (spiritualist) =

American New Age spiritualist (1900–1992)

- Born: May 2, 1900; Mount Shasta, California, U.S.
- Died: June 16, 1992 (aged 92); Arizona, U.S.
- Other names: Marian Keech; Sister Thedra

Dorothy Martin (May 2, 1900 – June 16, 1992) a.k.a. "Marian Keech", later known as "Sister Thedra", was also an American New Age spiritualist best known for her 1954 prediction of a catastrophic flood and the arrival of extraterrestrials. Her small group of followers, informally known as The Seekers, became the subject of the influential social psychology study When Prophecy Fails (1956), which contributed to the development of cognitive dissonance theory. Martin later founded spiritual organizations and produced channeled writings attributed to non-human intelligences.

== Early life ==
Dorothy Martin was born in Mount Shasta, California, and spent much of her early adulthood moving throughout the Midwestern United States. Her interest in metaphysical teachings grew in the 1940s and early 1950s, during which she became involved in various esoteric, Theosophical, and New Thought circles. Martin claimed to possess automatic writing abilities through which she received messages from extraterrestrial beings from the planet Clarion.

== The 1954 prophecy and The Seekers ==
In the early 1950s, Martin reported receiving messages via mediumship from extraterrestrial entities she called the "Guardians" or beings from the planet Clarion. These ideas were published on December 17, 1954 in an edition of the Chicago Tribune through a spokesperson for Martin named Charles Laughead, pseudonym "Dr. Thomas Armstrong". These communications warned of an impending global catastrophe: a massive flood predicted to occur on December 21, 1954. This flood would go on to sink all of the current land masses, stretching from the Arctic Circle to the Gulf of Mexico and raise new ones from the sea. According to her writings, a flying saucer would arrive to rescue Martin and her followers, The Seekers, shortly before the disaster.

A small group of believers gathered around her home in Oak Park, Illinois, abandoning possessions and preparing for evacuation. The prophecy attracted growing media attention, as well as the interest of law enforcement and social psychologists: Leon Festinger, Henry W. Riecken, and Stanley Schachter who joined the group covertly to observe its dynamics. Martin would go on to be institutionalized for a short while to prevent her arrest for various charges such as "inciting a riot" and "contributing to the delinquency of minors". Local police sought out these charges due to the disturbances that her meetings caused, as well as children in her neighborhood reporting nightmares after speaking with Martin about her theories regarding space travel and extraterrestrials.

The predicted events did not occur. Following the failure of the prophecy, Martin's group briefly intensified its public outreach, an episode later used to illustrate how committed believers may respond to disconfirmation. The incident became a classic case study in the psychology of belief perseverance.

== Influence on social psychology ==
Dorothy Martin and her group were the focus of When Prophecy Fails (1956), authored by Leon Festinger, Henry W. Riecken, and Stanley Schachter. The book introduced a now-foundational account of cognitive dissonance in social psychology, describing how individuals may reinterpret or rationalize contradictory evidence to preserve core beliefs.

Dorothy Martin's significance in the development of cognitive dissonance theory lies not in her intentional contribution to psychology but in the unique sociological conditions she inadvertently provided for its formulation. Her 1954 prophecy, predicting a devastating flood and the arrival of extraterrestrials to save the faithful, offered social psychologists Festinger, Riecken, and Schachter a rare opportunity: the chance to observe a small, highly committed belief group confronted with the total failure of its central prediction. Their covert participation in her circle allowed them to witness firsthand the psychological mechanisms people use when deeply held beliefs collide with undeniable disconfirmation. Instead of abandoning the prophecy when no flood or flying saucer materialized, several of Martin's followers became more fervent, pivoting quickly toward proselytizing to spread their "truth." This counterintuitive reaction, strengthening belief after apparent failure, became the empirical basis for Festinger's pioneering articulation of cognitive dissonance: psychological conflict resulting from incongruous beliefs and attitudes held simultaneously. Martin's group allowed researchers to observe how people reduce this discomfort by reframing or rationalizing events, often in ways that preserve their original commitments. Her followers had invested time, emotion, reputation, and personal sacrifice into the prophecy, and abandoning it would have created overwhelming psychological dissonance. Rationalizing the failure by believing that their faith had "saved the world" or that the prophecy had been misunderstood offered a psychologically protective alternative.

Martin occupies a crucial, though indirect, position in the history of psychology: her failed apocalyptic prediction became the catalyst for one of the most influential theories of human belief, motivation, and rationalization. When Prophecy Fails (1956) has since been cited widely in social psychology, sociology of religion, and studies of new religious movements. Martin's group is often referenced as a prototypical example of prophetic disconfirmation.

== Later life and spiritual work ==
Following the notoriety surrounding the failed prophecy, Martin left Chicago and lived around the southwest in Arizona, California, Peru, and Bolivia, adopting the name Sister Thedra. She continued producing channeled messages that she attributed to advanced spiritual or extraterrestrial beings. Martin later founded the Association of Sananda and Sanat Kumara, through which she published additional teachings.

From the mid-1960s through the end of her life, Martin continued to channel messages she attributed to "ascended masters," and beings from higher realms, shifting her focus away from doomsday prophecy and toward spiritual transformation, cosmic evolution, and metaphysical guidance. These teachings were circulated through the ASSK's newsletters and publications, most notably A Call to Arms, a compilation of communiqués recorded between 1989 and 1992 that preserved many of her final channeled messages. Her group functioned as a dispersed network of followers who regarded her transmissions as instruction from higher spiritual intelligences. Although the movement remained small, it demonstrated how prophetic groups can survive failure by reframing their mission and broadening their message. While the details of Martin's travels and the full extent of her writings remain partially obscured due to limited independent documentation, her later work offers an important example of how UFO-based religious movements transitioned into the broader New Age milieu of the late twentieth century.

== Death ==
Dorothy Martin died on June 16, 1992, in Arizona, the exact cause unknown. Her spiritual organization continued disseminating her messages even well after her death, and she would go on to be seen as a driving force for cognitive dissonance theory, seeing as how her teachings and proclamations inspired the books that would introduce it.
