= True-believer syndrome =

Continued belief in a debunked theory

True-believer syndrome is an informal or rhetorical term coined by M. Lamar Keene in his 1976 book The Psychic Mafia. He began using the term to refer to people who continued to believe in a paranormal phenomenon or event, even after it had successfully been debunked or proven to have been staged. Keene considered it to be a cognitive disorder, and regarded it as being a key factor in the success of many psychic mediums.

The term "true believer" had earlier been used by Eric Hoffer in his 1951 book The True Believer to describe the psychological roots of fanatical groups.

True-believer syndrome could be considered a type of belief perseverance for paranormal phenomena.

== Psychology ==
In an article published in Skeptical Inquirer, psychologist Matthew J. Sharps and his colleagues analyzed and dissected the psychology of true believers and their behavior after the predicted apocalypse failed to happen. Using the 2012 Mayan apocalypse prophecy as an example, and citing several other similar cases, Sharps identified four psychological factors that compel these people to continue their belief (or even stronger belief) despite the conflicted reality.

- While not suffering from mental illness, people with subclinical dissociative tendencies have a higher inclination to experience disconnection with immediate physical reality and propensity to see highly improbable things with enhanced credulity. Such subclinical dissociation is usually associated with paranormal thinking.
- The more a belief is invested in, the more value will be placed in it and, as a consequence, result in the believer being more resistant to facts, evidence, or other aspects of reality that contradict it. Some members of a fringe group led by an individual pseudonymously known as Marian Keech had left their spouses and jobs and given up their possessions to prepare to board an alien spacecraft. When the world did not end, cognitive dissonance-reducing activity (belief disconfirmation response) provided an enhancement of their beliefs and an outlet for their heavy investment and discomfort in front of reality.
- In the continuum in human information processing, people with Gestalt processing will consider a concept without detailed analysis (as opposed to feature-intensive thinking) and accept the idea as a whole relatively uncritically. Sharps suggests a relationship between dissociative tendencies and gestalt processing. People who incline to believe paranormal activities will be more likely to credulously entertain the ancient Mayan prophecies whose details most people know little about.
- Under the mental shortcut of the availability heuristic, people place more importance and give more weight to a belief when examples related to the idea are more readily recalled, most often because they constitute recent information and are covered in the latest news reports. Information on Mayan prophecies has been abundantly available, especially in the media, before the expected apocalyptic date. People who have dissociative tendencies toward the supernatural and favor gestalt processing tend to bias their judgments toward the latest news.

== Examples ==
=== M. Lamar Keene and "Raoul" ===
In his book The Psychic Mafia, Keene told of his partner, a psychic medium named "Raoul". Some in their congregation still believed that Raoul was genuine, even after Keene openly admitted that he was a fake. Keene wrote "I knew how easy it was to make people believe a lie, but I didn't expect the same people, confronted with the lie, would choose it over the truth. ... No amount of logic can shatter a faith consciously based on a lie."

=== José Alvarez and "Carlos" ===
According to The Skeptic's Dictionary, an example of this syndrome is evidenced by an event in 1988 when stage magician James Randi, at the request of an Australian news program, coached stage performer José Alvarez to pretend he was channelling a two-thousand-year-old spirit named "Carlos". Even after it was revealed to be a fictional character created by Randi and Alvarez, many people continued to believe that "Carlos" was real. Randi commented: "no amount of evidence, no matter how good it is or how much there is of it, is ever going to convince the true believer to the contrary."

=== Marian Keech and "Clarion" ===
In the book When Prophecy Fails, Festinger and his colleagues observed a fringe group led by "Marian Keech" (researchers' pseudonym) who believed that the world would be destroyed on December 21, 1954, and the true believers would be rescued by aliens on a spaceship to a fictional planet, Clarion. When nothing happened, the group believed that their devotion convinced God to spare the world and they became even more feverish in proselytizing their belief. This is one of the first cases that led Festinger to form the theory of cognitive dissonance.

=== Harold Camping's 2011 end times prediction ===
American Christian radio host Harold Camping claimed that the Rapture and Judgment Day would take place on May 21, 2011, and that the end of the world would take place five months later on October 21, 2011, based on adding the 153 fish of John 20 to May 21. Camping, who was then president of the Family Radio Christian network, claimed the Bible as his source and said May 21 would be the date of the Rapture and the day of judgment "beyond the shadow of a doubt". Camping suggested that it would occur at 6 pm local time, with the Rapture sweeping the globe time zone by time zone, while some of his supporters claimed that around 200 million people (approximately 3% of the world's population) would be "raptured". Camping had previously claimed that the Rapture would occur in September 1994. Following the failure of the prediction, media attention shifted to the response from Camping and his followers. On May 23, Camping amended that May 21 had been a "spiritual" day of judgment, and that the physical Rapture would occur on October 21, 2011, simultaneously with the destruction of the universe by God. However, on October 16, Camping admitted to an interviewer that he did not know when the end would come.

== See also ==
- Belief perseverance – Maintenance of a belief despite new information that firmly contradicts it
- Cognitive dissonance – Mental phenomenon of holding contradictory beliefs
- Confirmation bias – Bias confirming existing attitudes
- Conspiracy theory – Attributing events to an improbable conspiracy
- Critical thinking – Analysis of facts to form a judgment
- Delusion – Fixation of holding false beliefs
- Denialism – Rejecting scientific or historical consensus
- Disconfirmed expectancy – Psychological term for what is commonly known as a failed prophecy
- Escalation of commitment – Human behavior pattern in which the participant takes on increasing risk
- Fanaticism – Behavior involving obsessive enthusiasm
- List of cognitive biases
- Magical thinking – Belief in the connection of unrelated events
- Partisan (politics) – Committed supporter of a political party or belief
- Sunk cost – Unrecoverable cost that has been incurred
- Superstition – Belief or behavior that is considered irrational or supernatural
- Viruses of the Mind – 1991 essay by Richard Dawkins
- Wishful thinking – Formation of beliefs based on what might be pleasing to imagine
