= Failed prophecy =

Failed prophecy may refer to:

- Disconfirmed expectancy – Psychological term for what is commonly known as a failed prophecy
- Falsifiability – Property of a statement that can be logically contradicted
- When Prophecy Fails – 1956 book of social psychology
- List of dates predicted for apocalyptic events
- Unfulfilled Christian religious predictions
- Unfulfilled Watch Tower Society predictions – Watch Tower Society unfulfilled predictions
