= Dorothy Martin =

Dorothy Martin may refer to:

- Dorothy Martin (spiritualist) (1900–1992), Chicago prophet who was one of the subjects of the book When Prophecy Fails
- Dorothy Martin, adopted name of aviator Dot Lemon (1907–1986)
- Dorothy Martin, vocalist in the band Dorothy
- Dottie Martin (Dorothy Ann Martin, born 1937), first lady of North Carolina
