= Disconfirmed expectancy =

Psychological term for what is commonly known as a failed prophecy

Disconfirmed expectancy is a psychological term for what is commonly known as a failed prophecy. According to the American social psychologist Leon Festinger's theory of cognitive dissonance, disconfirmed expectancies create a state of psychological discomfort because the outcome contradicts expectancy. Upon recognizing the falsification of an expected event an individual will experience the competing cognitions, "I believe [X]," and, "I observed [Y]." The individual must either discard the now disconfirmed belief or justify why it has not actually been disconfirmed. As such, disconfirmed expectancy and the factors surrounding the individual's consequent actions have been studied in various settings.

== Initial study ==
Disconfirmed expectancy was famously illustrated in the 1956 book When Prophecy Fails by Leon Festinger, Henry W. Riecken, and Stanley Schachter. The book gave an inside account of a doomsday cult led by Dorothy Martin (given the alias "Marion Keech" to preserve her privacy), of Chicago. Martin claimed to have received messages from aliens forecasting a flood that would end the world on December 21, 1954. Festinger and his researchers took the chance to pretend to be a part of the cult in order to observe its behaviors and reaction when the flood failed to occur. Furthermore, Festinger's theory of cognitive dissonance, which would be published the following year, predicted that the failure of the prophecy would not break the cult. Instead the group members would look for ways to justify their actions and maintain confidence in the cult.

Some members abandoned the group when the prophecy failed to be fulfilled, but most stayed. Those who stayed did not have weakened resolve. There was in fact an increase in their proselytization and their fervor for the new religion. The prediction of the Earth's destruction became a disconfirmed expectancy which resulted in the dissonant cognitions "the world is going to end" and "the world did not end". Those who left the cult accepted that they were wrong and discarded their false cognition. Those who stayed instead looked for ways to explain the event in a way that would maintain their beliefs. Eventually they came to the agreement that the planet was spared because of their prayers and actions. Festinger et al. theorized that five conditions must be present for this to occur; that is, there are five conditions that must be met such that a disconfirmation can lead to increased strength of belief: strong belief, commitment to the belief, the possibility that the belief is false, recognition of the disconfirmation, and strong social support (these are detailed below).

=== Conditions for attitude change ===
In When Prophecy Fails the authors describe five conditions under which disconfirmation of a belief may lead to increased fervor in a believer:

1. A belief must be held with conviction
  The believer must behave in a manner consistent with this belief
2. The believer must be committed to the belief
  This is apparent when the person holding the belief commits to some action(s) that is difficult to undo, such as selling all of one's possessions or participating in an illegal lifestyle, as with the traditionally polygamist Fundamentalist Church of Jesus Christ of Latter-Day Saints
3. The belief must be falsifiable
  That is, the belief must be specific enough that a real-world event could disconfirm it
4. Contradictory evidence must be presented to and recognized by the believer
  The belief must be unequivocally disconfirmed to the believer
5. The individual believer must have social support

The fifth condition is especially important as it states the specific circumstance under which the belief can continue after disconfirmation. Points one and two are necessary conditions that are likely to influence the believer to be resistant to changing the belief. Points three and four are the factors that indicate the belief is flawed and should be absolutely discarded. Thus, the believer is subject to a large amount of cognitive dissonance: "I believe something that is not true." In the absence of adequate social support, it is likely that the belief will be discarded to alleviate this pressure.

== Subsequent study of failed prophecy ==
Following Festinger et al., many others have studied cults based around an unlikely prophecy. As of 1999, twelve other groups had been studied under similar circumstances. Research on these other groups formed around prophetic revelations suggests that their survival following disconfirmation is a more complex matter than When Prophecy Fails describes it. There are at least five different patterns of adaptive proselytization which have been observed:

1. Survive and begin proselytization
2. Survive and continue proselytization
3. Survive and decline in proselytization
4. Survive but do not proselytize
5. Neither survive nor proselytize

While one of the patterns here involves the dissolution of the group ("neither survive nor proselytize") this is in the extreme minority as 11 of the 12 groups referenced above continued after disconfirmation of their respective prophecies.

In addition to proselytization there are other adaptive strategies including reaffirmation and rationalization which are influenced not only by in-group social support, but also decisive leadership, sophistication of ideology, vagueness of the prophecy, ritual framing, and organization. Rationalization can often go to lengths to justify the false belief. One of the more popular forms of rationalization is "spiritualization" where the event is said to have happened in the spiritual level and not the physical.

== Attributional processing ==
Though much research has been done showing the role that disconfirmed expectancy plays in the attitudes and behavior of cultists, it likely plays a larger more general role in attributional processing and has been shown to instigate causal analysis.

In theory, when events conform to expectation there is little chance that people will analyze the causes of those events. For an expected event, there is no need to update the pre-existing causal theory that was driving the expectancy. On this logic an unexpected event would likely instigate causal analysis as the existing theory has been proven false or incomplete.

In 1973 Newtson showed two groups of people an acted sequence and instructed them to break the sequence into parts. Those who watched an actor perform in an unexpected manner were more likely to break the sequence into smaller meaningful units than those watching an actor perform in an expected manner. Newtson concluded that participants in this study were attending more closely and forming more detailed causal analyses when the actor's behavior deviated from expectation.

A later study by Pyszcynski and Greenberg took a more direct approach by creating an expectancy in participants, either fulfilling or deviating from that expectancy, and then presenting the participants with various information to choose from. They found that people were more likely to look for information that would be "useful for inferring a cause" following disconfirmation and less likely to do so following a confirmation of their expectancy.

Though people are more likely to engage in causal processing when there is a discrepancy between belief and outcome, there is a strong bias towards expectancy confirmation. Similarly, disconfirming behavior can be discredited in many ways, including but not limited to selective attention to confirmatory evidence and biased labeling.

== Uses as a methodology ==
As noted above, disconfirmed expectancy is often paired with cognitive dissonance because the disconfirmation results in two competing cognitions within the individual. As such, disconfirmed expectancy is often used as a reliable method for inducing cognitive dissonance in experimental designs. Generally this is done by introducing an outcome which is dissonant with the participant's established self-concept. The self-concept is often induced as well by creating a strong expectancy toward a certain outcome. For example, in Carlsmith and Aronson (1963) participants were led to believe that a set of signals would reliably precede certain outcomes. To create the disconfirmation, after a few trials the experimenters paired a new outcome with a previous stimulus.

When this is not possible, participants are sorted into groups or placed onto a graded scale according to their prior beliefs. Experimenters can do this as Festinger and his researchers did, i.e. join a cult and observe the impending disconfirmation, though this can also be achieved by pre-testing participants and grouping them based on their responses. These methods—covert/participant observation, pre-selection—are not ideal because they pose the problem of selection bias due to non-random assignment.

=== Selected studies ===
The following studies have been selected to show a variety of effects found using experimental paradigms which utilize disconfirmed expectancy. This is by no means an exhaustive or comprehensive list. See Further reading below for more comprehensive reviews on the material.

==== Hedonic consequences ====
Disconfirmed expectancies can influence basic hedonic judgment. According to Festinger, cognitive dissonance produces "psychological discomfort". As Carlsmith and Aronson (1963) extrapolated, it follows that this discomfort puts the individual in a negative hedonic state. Furthermore, they theorized that a negative hedonic state should bias individuals to judge environmental objects in a more negative manner.

In the specific study, participants were asked to taste various solutions and rate them on bitterness and sweetness. Participants were additionally instructed to predict whether a bitter solution or a sweet solution would be tasted next, and they were given multiple trials where predictions were rigged to be correct. When participants were incorrect in their guess and had also been correct on the two preceding trials it was labeled a disconfirmed expectancy, as they had developed an expectancy over the two correct trials which was then denied. Following the disconfirmed expectancies participants reliably rated solutions as less pleasant: sweet solutions were rated less sweet and bitter solutions were rated more bitter.

==== Consumer dissatisfaction ====
Dissonance theory predicts consumers experience cognitive dissonance when product expectation deviates from product performance. To reduce this disparity and alleviate psychological discomfort the consumer is likely to bring expectations in line with product performance. This statement has been contested and some evidence against is given in a classic paper showing that attitudes tend to further polarize when the conflicting information falls outside of the individual's latitude of acceptance. That is, if the performance is too poor the product will simply be rejected and the consumer will like it even less.

Anderson (1973) suggests an assimilation-contrast model that combines the two models. He notes that "there is a point beyond which consumers will not accept increasing disparity between product claims and actual [negative] performance". At this point, which Muzafer Sherif would label the edge of one's latitude of acceptance, reasonable consideration is no longer given towards product performance and the individual is further polarized towards rejection. Anderson further notes that these results pertain to simply explained products and may not generalize to more complex items.

==== Vacationing ====
Pizam and Milman (1993) show that expectancy disconfirmations are good predictor of satisfaction among first-time visitors to a destination. In this study disconfirmations were regressed on a rating of fulfillment of expectations. The larger the discrepancy between expectation and outcome the more that factor influenced the fulfillment rating. Not all disconfirmations are good predictors of the fulfillment rating. The types of disconfirmations that prove to be good predictors are dependent on the goals of the traveler. For instance a disconfirmation related to the "quality of deluxe hotels" is more influential for travelers categorized as "sun-seekers" than for those categorized as "culture seekers". This suggests that individual factors are weighted for their relative importance to one's own satisfaction.

==== Evaluations of communicators ====
Expectancy plays a big role in the judgment of communicators and their behavior. When people have expectancies regarding a communicator they evaluate the communicator' attributes and behavior much differently. Prior expectations are likely to continue to be held even after interaction with the communicator, and these expectations will influence later judgments.

There seems to be a general expectancy towards pleasant communication and when this is violated evaluations of the target speaker are more negative, even on evaluations of personal attributes. This can work in the opposite direction as well, and a positive deviation from a negative expectancy has a stronger effect on evaluations than confirmations do. That is, merely interacting with another person can leave a less favorable impression of that person than if a prior negative expectancy was held and then disconfirmed through interaction.

== See also ==
- True-believer syndrome
- Great Disappointment, the response of the Millerite Movement to failed prophecies in 1844
