= Conservatism (belief revision) =

Cognitive bias

In cognitive psychology and decision science, conservatism or conservatism bias is a bias which refers to the tendency to revise one's belief insufficiently when presented with new evidence. This bias describes human belief revision in which people over-weigh the prior distribution (base rate) and under-weigh new sample evidence when compared to Bayesian belief-revision.

According to the theory, "opinion change is very orderly, and usually proportional to the numbers of Bayes' theorem – but it is insufficient in amount". In other words, people update their prior beliefs as new evidence becomes available, but they do so more slowly than they would if they used Bayes' theorem.

This bias was discussed by Ward Edwards in 1968, who reported on experiments like the following one:

There are two bookbags, one containing 700 red and 300 blue chips, the other containing 300 red and 700 blue. Take one of the bags. Now, you sample, randomly, with replacement after each chip. In 12 samples, you get 8 reds and 4 blues. what is the probability that this is the predominantly red bag?

Most subjects chose an answer around .7. The correct answer according to Bayes' theorem is closer to .97 (based on Bayes' theorem:$\frac{0.7^8 \times 0.3^4}{0.7^8 \times 0.3 ^4 + 0.3^8 \times 0.7^4}$). Edwards suggested that people updated beliefs conservatively, in accordance with Bayes' theorem, but more slowly. They updated from .5 incorrectly according to an observed bias in several experiments.

== In finance ==
In finance, evidence has been found that investors under-react to corporate events, consistent with conservatism. This includes announcements of earnings, changes in dividends, and stock splits.

== Possible explanations ==
The traditional explanation for this effect is that it is an extension of the anchoring bias, as studied by Tversky and Kahneman. The initial "anchor" is the .5 probability given when there are two choices without any other evidence, and people fail to adjust sufficiently far away. Alternatively, one study suggested that the belief revising conservatism can be explained by an information-theoretic generative mechanism that assumes a noisy conversion of objective evidence (observation) into subjective estimates (judgement). The study explains that the estimates of conditional probabilities are conservative because of noise in the retrieval of information from memory, whereas noise is defined as the mixing of evidence. For instance, if objective evidence indicates the probability of an event occurs is 1, i.e., P(A) = 1 and P(¬A) = 0, whereas according to the memory of a subject, the probabilities are P(A') = 0.727 and P(¬A') = 0.273 respectively. When the evidence is noised by memory with probability of P(Á | A') = 0.8, p(¬Á | A') = 0.2, P(Á | ¬A') = 0.2 and P(¬Á | ¬A') = 0.8, the estimate (judgement) is smoothed to be P(Á) = 0.636 and P(¬Á)=0.364. The estimated values (0.636, 0.364) are less extreme or more conservative than the actual evidence (1 and 0). In an incentivized experimental study, it has been shown that the conservatism bias decreased in those with greater cognitive ability, though it did not disappear.

== See also ==
- Base rate fallacy
- Belief perseverance
- Confirmation bias
- Strong prior
