= The Seekers (rapturists) =

1950s UFO religion

- Type: New religious movement
- Classification: UFO religion
- Leader: Dorothy Martin
- Founder: Charles Laughead
- Origin: 1953; United States
- Other name: The Brotherhood of the Seven Rays

The Seekers, also called The Brotherhood of the Seven Rays, were a group of rapturists or a UFO religion in mid-twentieth century Midwestern United States. The Seekers met in a nondenominational church; the group was originally organized in 1953 by Charles Laughead, a staff member at Michigan State University in East Lansing, Michigan. They were led by Dorothy Martin (also called Sister Thedra) from the Chicago area, who believed a UFO would save them from a catastrophe on December 21, 1954. They are believed to have been the earliest UFO religion.

Martin told her followers that the United States was going to be destroyed by a massive earthquake and a huge tidal wave on December 21, 1954, according to telepathic messages that she claimed to have received from aliens. She called the aliens the Guardians and said they came from a planet called Clarion. Believers would be saved from the destruction by flying saucers that would take them to Clarion.

The Seekers were the subject of the book When Prophecy Fails by Leon Festinger, in which Laughead was given the pseudonym Dr. Armstrong and Martin the name Marian Keech. Festinger infiltrated the Seekers with the goal of studying their cognitive reactions and coping mechanisms when their beliefs failed, a thought process which Festinger named cognitive dissonance. When the UFO did not arrive, a majority of the members became convinced it would arrive on Christmas Eve, at which time their second disappointment produced even greater dissonance. In the book, Festinger and his colleagues write, "The experiences of this observer well characterize the state of affairs following the Christmas caroling episode—a persistent, frustrating search for orders."
