= When Prophecy Fails =

1956 book of social psychology

When Prophecy Fails: A Social and Psychological Study of a Modern Group That Predicted the Destruction of the World
- Book cover, 1964 edition
- Author: Leon Festinger, Henry Riecken, Stanley Schachter
- Language: English
- Subject: Psychology
- Genre: Non-fiction
- Publisher: Harper-Torchbooks
- Publication date: January 1, 1956
- Publication place: United States
- Media type: Hardcover
- Pages: 253
- ISBN: 0-06-131132-4
- OCLC: 217969

When Prophecy Fails: A Social and Psychological Study of a Modern Group That Predicted the Destruction of the World is a classic work of social psychology by Leon Festinger, Henry Riecken, and Stanley Schachter, published in 1956, detailing a study of a small UFO religion in Chicago called the Seekers that believed in an imminent apocalypse. The authors took a particular interest in the members' coping mechanisms after the event did not occur, focusing on the cognitive dissonance between the members' beliefs and actual events, and the psychological consequences of these disconfirmed expectations. Later archival work has alleged that many of the book's core claims are based on fabrications or exaggerations.

== Overview ==
Festinger, Riecken, and Schachter were already studying the effects of prophecy disconfirmation on groups of believers when they read a story in a local newspaper headlined "Prophecy from Planet. Clarion Call to City: Flee That Flood. It'll Swamp us on Dec. 21". The prophecy came from Dorothy Martin (1900–1992), a Chicago housewife who practised automatic writing, and it outlined a catastrophe predicted for a specific date in their near future. Seeing an opportunity to test their theories with a contemporary case study, the research team infiltrated Martin's followers to collect data before, during, and after the time the prophecy would be refuted.

Martin claimed to be receiving messages from superior beings from a planet she referred to as Clarion. A recently published book, Aboard a Flying Saucer by UFO contactee Truman Bethurum, had described his alleged interactions with beings from a planet also named Clarion. The messages received by Martin included a prophecy that Lake City and large portions of the United States, Canada, Central America, and Europe would be destroyed by a flood before dawn on December 21, 1954. Through the restrained recruitment activities of Charles Laughead (a college doctor in Michigan) and other acquaintances, Martin was supported in her mediumship by a small group of believers. Some of the believers took significant actions that indicated a high degree of commitment to the prophecy. Some left or lost their jobs, neglected or ended their studies, ended relationships and friendships with non-believers, gave away money, and/or disposed of possessions to prepare for their departure on a flying saucer, which they believed would rescue them and others before the flood.

As anticipated by the research team, the prophesied date passed without any sign of the predicted flood, creating a dissonance between the group's commitment to the prophecy and the unfolding reality. Different members of the group reacted differently. Many of those with the highest levels of belief, commitment, and social support became more committed to their beliefs, began to court publicity in ways they had not before, and developed various rationalizations for the absence of the flood. Some others, with less prior conviction and commitment, and/or less access to ongoing group support, were less able to sustain or increase their previous levels of belief and involvement, and several left the group. The research team's findings were broadly in line with their initial hypothesis about how believers might react to a prophecy disconfirmation, depending on whether certain conditions were in place.

== Study ==
=== Hypothesis ===
Festinger, Riecken and Schachter used the study to test their theories on how people might be expected to behave when faced with a specific type of dissonance, arising from a failed prophecy. From historical examples, such as the Montanists, Anabaptists, Sabbateans, Millerites and the beginnings of Christianity, the team had seen that in some cases the failure of a prophecy, rather than causing a rejection of the original belief system, could lead believers to increase their personal commitment, and also increase their efforts to recruit others into the belief. They identified five conditions that they proposed could lead to this type of reaction:

Conditions for increased fervour after disconfirmation
Condition	Effect
"1. A belief must be held with deep conviction and it must have some relevance to action, that is, to what the believer does or how he or she behaves."	Makes the belief resistant to change.
"2. The person holding the belief must have committed himself to it; that is, for the sake of his belief, he must have taken some important action that is difficult to undo. In general, the more important such actions are, and the more difficult they are to undo, the greater is the individual's commitment to the belief."	Makes the belief resistant to change.
"3. The belief must be sufficiently specific and sufficiently concerned with the real world so that events may unequivocally refute the belief."	Exposes believers to the possibility of their belief being disproved.
"4. Such undeniable disconfirmatory evidence must occur and must be recognized by the individual holding the belief."	Exerts pressure on believers to abandon their belief.
"5. The individual believer must have social support."	While an individual might be unable to resist the pressure to abandon their belief in the face of disconfirming facts, a group might be able to support each other to maintain the belief.

In the case of all conditions being in place, their hypothesis was that believers would find it difficult to abandon their beliefs in the face of disconfirmation, would use their available social support to maintain their beliefs, and would try to increase consonance by recruitment through proselytizing, on the grounds that "If more and more people can be persuaded that the system of belief is correct, then clearly it must after all be correct."

The research team considered that all of the conditions were likely to be fulfilled in the case study involving Martin and her followers. In this case, if the group's leader could add consonant elements by converting others to the basic premise, then the magnitude of her dissonance following disconfirmation would be reduced. The research team predicted that the inevitable disconfirmation would be followed by an enthusiastic effort at proselyting to seek social support and lessen the pain of disconfirmation.

=== Methodology ===
The study was principally qualitative in nature, with data collected through participant observation, without the permission of the people being observed. The authors of the study and a selection of paid observers infiltrated groups of believers in two locations, in order to collect data as trusted insiders. Posing as people with a genuine personal interest in flying saucers and the group's belief system, the observers built rapport with the group members, aiming to take as passive a role as possible whilst gathering information on the group. Between them, the observers aimed to be present at all key events. Following each notable occurrence, each observer would attempt to excuse themselves in order to write up their notes or record them on audiotape while their memory was still fresh. They would record their notes in a variety of locations, including the bathroom of the house, the porch, or in a nearby hotel room that had been rented for the purpose. In addition to their own notes, the observers collected artifacts such as originals or copies of automatic writing produced by Martin, and transcripts of taped telephone calls that the research subjects themselves had recorded and lent to the observers.

In order to protect the privacy of the research subjects, the authors used pseudonyms for all group members and the locations of the study.

Pseudonyms used in the study
Name	Pseudonym
Dorothy Martin	Marian Keech
Charles Laughead	Dr Thomas Armstrong
Chicago	Lake City
Detroit	Steel City
East Lansing	Collegeville

=== Belief system of the research subjects ===
The belief system of the group evolved continuously before, during and after the study. Martin's early influences, as outlined in the study, included theosophy, Godfré Ray King, and John Ballou Newbrough, as well as a general interest in flying saucers and extraterrestrial visitors. Martin had previously been involved with L. Ron Hubbard's Dianetics movement, and she incorporated ideas from what later became Scientology.

Martin began practising automatic writing, initially receiving messages allegedly from her deceased father. Martin believed her father was living in "the astral", which was populated by myriad spirits and beings. She believed that there were different frequencies of spiritual vibration, with less dense frequencies equating to a higher level of existence: higher levels were home to more developed spiritual beings. She went on to believe she was receiving messages from a high-level spiritual instructor called Elder Brother and other spiritual beings called The Guardians, who were living on planets called Clarion and Cerus. Her main source of messages became Sananda, who she understood to be the contemporary manifestation of the historical Jesus. Christianity was therefore central to the belief system as it evolved. As Martin began to draw a group of fellow believers around her, she developed the system alongside others who had studied other aspects of the occult and supposed extraterrestrial life, exposing the system with a wider range of influences. Another group member (pseudonym Bertha Blatsky) also claimed to be receiving and vocalising messages from spacemen, and Martin and "Blatsky" would sometimes undertake a verification process of each other's messages. Based on ongoing direct revelation, the belief system was highly fluid and adaptive.

The group understood the Guardians to be benign spiritual teachers of humanity, newly able to make contact with humans through atmospheric changes brought about by the testing of nuclear weapons. They understood that extraterrestrial visits to earth were about to increase, and that it was possible for spacemen to visit in a human form or "sice", making it possible that any newcomer could be a spaceman in disguise. They also believed in a future cataclysmic event that would lead to widespread destruction and the purification of the Earth, and that selected humans would be rescued by space ship by the Guardians in advance of this event – this was the prediction that provided the focal point of the study. Following the failure of this prediction to materialise, those remaining in the group came to believe that their own activities had influenced events and that God had temporarily saved the world from destruction.

=== Sequence of events ===
Festinger, Riecken and Schachter reported the following sequence of events:

- December 17. Ms. Keech received a phone call from person identifying himself as "Captain Video" from outer space, telling her that a saucer was to land in her backyard to pick her up at 4 o'clock in the afternoon. (Festinger considers this call to have been made by a practical joker reacting to press coverage of Keech's group.) Some of the group initially questioned the call, before accepting it and preparing themselves to be collected by the saucer, removing all metal objects from their persons. By 5:30 pm the group appeared to have given up, and were reluctant to discuss the issue of why the saucer had not arrived. When the matter was discussed, they agreed that the event had been a practice session. Ms. Keech received another message later that day that the saucer would pick them up at 1:30 am. The group waited for the saucer until 3:30 am then gave up.
- Before December 20. The group shuns publicity. Interviews are given only grudgingly. Access to Keech's house is only provided to those who can convince the group that they are true believers. The group evolves a belief system – provided by the automatic writing from the planet Clarion – to explain the details of the cataclysm, the reason for its occurrence, and the manner in which the group would be saved from the disaster.
- December 20. The group expects a visitor from outer space to call upon them at midnight and to escort them to a waiting spacecraft. As instructed, the group goes to great lengths to remove all metallic items from their persons. As midnight approaches, zippers, bra straps, and other objects are discarded. The group waits.
- 12:05 am. December 21. No visitor. Someone in the group notices that another clock in the room shows 11:55. The group agrees that it is not yet midnight.
- 12:10 am. The second clock strikes midnight. Still no visitor. The group sits in stunned silence. The cataclysm itself is no more than seven hours away.
- 4:00 am. The group has been sitting in stunned silence. A few attempts at finding explanations have failed. Keech begins to cry.
- 4:45 am. Another message by automatic writing is sent to Keech. It states, in effect, that the God of Earth has decided to spare the planet from destruction. The cataclysm has been called off: "The little group, sitting all night long, had spread so much light that God had saved the world from destruction."
- Afternoon, December 21. Newspapers are called; interviews are sought. In a reversal of its previous distaste for publicity, the group begins an urgent campaign to spread its message to as broad an audience as possible.
- December 24. The group had invited the press to publicise a new prediction that spacemen would land in a flying saucer and pick them up. While waiting, they sang Christmas carols, watched by "some 200 unruly spectators". The police had to be called to control the mob. The community was not happy with Mrs. Keech.
- December 26. A warrant was issued for Mrs. Keech and Dr. Armstrong for several charges.

== Aftermath ==
After the failure of the prediction, Martin was threatened with arrest and involuntary commitment, and left Chicago. She later founded the Association of Sananda and Sanat Kumara. Under the name Sister Thedra, she continued to practice channeling and participating in contactee groups until her death in 1992.

== Findings challenged ==
Festinger, Riecken and Schachter's study had previously been criticized on methodological grounds. Fernando Bermejo-Rubio summarizes these critiques:

To start with, When Prophecy Fails has been faulted on methodological grounds. The original observed phenomenon was not an uncontaminated series of events generated by a group in isolation. It was in fact mediated and studied by observers (social scientists and the press) and therefore subjected to interferences and distortions resulting from their presence. It has been remarked that often almost one-third of the membership of the group consisted of participant observers. More significantly, the social scientists themselves contributed to the events described. Furthermore, the media continually badgered the group to account for its commitment; thus, the increased proselytizing and affirmations of faith may have been influenced by media pressure. These conditions make it difficult to determine what might have happened if the group had been left on its own. A second problem is that the working hypothesis of the sociologists seems to have shaped, to a high degree, their perception of the events and the account given of the group, leading to an inaccurate report. That hypothesis involved identifying two phases, a period of secrecy in which the elect did not actively seek to gain followers or influence and, as a reaction to the disconfirmation of a prediction, a period of proselytizing. The portrayal of the group as merely based on a prediction, however, made Festinger and his colleagues overlook other dimensions (spiritual, moral, cultural) which might be crucial for the movement (Van Fossen 1988: 195).

A 2025 article by Thomas Kelly argued that the main theses of the book are false and were known to be false by the authors. On the basis on archival material, Kelly accused the authors of fabricating psychic messages and interfering in a child welfare investigation.

== Related work ==
In 2021, psychologist Stuart Vyse used Festinger, Riecken and Schachter's research when looking at the QAnon conspiracy theory. Vyse asks "Now that the QAnon group's most important prophecy has failed, will they become disillusioned, more committed, or neither?" The first four conditions for increased fervour after disconfirmation are fulfilled with QAnon faithful, only the last condition of continuing social support is the question. As of April 2021, QDrops have stopped but with the Internet these believers will find each other and will continue to socially support each other. Vyse states that all depends on if Donald Trump reemerges or is marginalized and no other "demagogic leader emerges".

== See also ==
- Unfulfilled Christian religious predictions
- New religious movement
