= Leon Festinger =

American social psychologist (1919–1989)

- Born: May 8, 1919; New York City, New York, U.S.
- Died: February 11, 1989 (aged 69); New York City, New York, U.S.
- Education: City College of New York (BS); University of Iowa (MA, PhD)
- Known for: Cognitive dissonance; Effort justification; Social comparison theory
- Scientific career
- Fields: Psychology
- Workplaces: Massachusetts Institute of Technology; University of Michigan; University of Minnesota; Stanford University; The New School
- Thesis: Experimental test of a theory of decision (1942)
- Doctoral advisor: Kurt Lewin
- Doctoral students: Bertram Raven; Stanley Schachter

Leon Festinger (8 May 1919 – 11 February 1989) was an American social psychologist who originated the theory of cognitive dissonance and social comparison theory. The rejection of the previously dominant behaviorist view of social psychology by demonstrating the inadequacy of stimulus-response conditioning accounts of human behavior is largely attributed to his theories and research. Festinger is also credited with advancing the use of laboratory experimentation in social psychology, although he simultaneously stressed the importance of studying real-life situations, a principle he practiced when personally infiltrating a doomsday cult. He is also known in social network theory for the proximity effect (or propinquity).

Festinger studied psychology under Kurt Lewin, an important figure in modern social psychology, at the University of Iowa, graduating in 1941; however, he did not develop an interest in social psychology until after joining the faculty at Lewin's Research Center for Group Dynamics at the Massachusetts Institute of Technology in 1945. Despite his preeminence in social psychology, Festinger turned to visual perception research in 1964 and then archaeology, history, and the human evolutionary sciences in 1979 until his death in 1989. Following B. F. Skinner, Jean Piaget, Sigmund Freud, and Albert Bandura, Festinger was the fifth most cited psychologist of the 20th century.

== Life ==
=== Early life and education ===
Festinger was born in Brooklyn New York on May 8, 1919 to Russian-Jewish immigrants Alex Festinger and Sara Solomon Festinger. His father, an embroidery manufacturer, had "left Russia a radical and atheist and remained faithful to these views throughout his life." Festinger attended Boys' High School in Brooklyn, and received his BS degree in psychology from the City College of New York in 1939.

He proceeded to study under Kurt Lewin at the University of Iowa, where Festinger received his MA in 1940 and PhD in 1942 in the field of child behavior. By his own admission, he was not interested in social psychology when he arrived at Iowa, and did not take a single course in social psychology during his entire time there; instead, he was interested in Lewin's earlier work on tension systems, but Lewin's focus had shifted to social psychology by the time Festinger arrived at Iowa. However, Festinger continued to pursue his original interests, studying level of aspiration, working on statistics, developing a quantitative model of decision making, and even publishing a laboratory study on rats. Explaining his lack of interest in social psychology at the time, Festinger stated, "The looser methodology of the social psychology studies, and the vagueness of relation of the data to Lewinian concepts and theories, all seemed unappealing to me in my youthful penchant for rigor." Festinger considered himself to be a freethinker and an atheist.

After graduating, Festinger worked as a research associate at Iowa from 1941 to 1943, and then as a statistician for the Committee on Selection and Training of Aircraft Pilots at the University of Rochester from 1943 to 1945 during World War II. In 1943, Festinger married Mary Oliver Ballou, a pianist, with whom he had three children, Catherine, Richard, and Kurt. Festinger and Ballou were later divorced, and Festinger married Trudy Bradley, currently a professor of social work emeritus at New York University, in 1968.

=== Career ===
In 1945, Festinger joined Lewin's newly formed Research Center for Group Dynamics at the Massachusetts Institute of Technology as an assistant professor. It was at MIT that Festinger, in his own words, "became, by fiat, a social psychologist, and immersed myself in the field with all its difficulties, vaguenesses, and challenges." It was also at MIT that Festinger began his foray into social communication and pressures in groups that marked a turning point in his own research. As Festinger himself recalls, "the years at M.I.T. [sic] seemed to us all to be momentous, ground breaking, the new beginning of something important." Indeed, Stanley Schachter, Festinger's student and research assistant at the time, states, "I was lucky enough to work with Festinger at this time, and I think of it as one of the high points of my scientific life."

Yet, this endeavor "started as almost an accident" while Festinger was conducting a study on the impact of architectural and ecological factors on student housing satisfaction for the university. Although the proximity effect (or propinquity) was an important direct finding from the study, Festinger and his collaborators also noticed correlations between the degree of friendship within a group of residents and the similarity of opinions within the group, thus raising unexpected questions regarding communication within social groups and the development of group standards of attitudes and behaviors. Indeed, Festinger's seminal 1950 paper on informal social communication as a function of pressures toward attitude uniformity within a group cites findings from this seemingly unrelated housing satisfaction study multiple times.

After Lewin's death in 1947, Festinger moved with the research center to the University of Michigan in 1948. He then moved to the University of Minnesota in 1951, and then on to Stanford University in 1955. During this time, Festinger published his highly influential paper on social comparison theory, extending his prior theory regarding the evaluation of attitudes in social groups to the evaluation of abilities in social groups. Following this, in 1957, Festinger published his theory of cognitive dissonance, arguably his most famous and influential contribution to the field of social psychology. Some also view this as an extension of Festinger's prior work on group pressures toward resolving discrepancies in attitudes and abilities within social groups to how the individual resolves discrepancies at the cognitive level. Festinger also received considerable recognition during this time for his work, both from within the field, being awarded the Distinguished Scientific Contribution Award by the American Psychological Association in 1959, and outside of the field, being named as one of America's ten most promising scientists by Fortune magazine shortly after publishing social comparison theory.

Despite such recognition, Festinger left the field of social psychology in 1964, attributing his decision to "a conviction that had been growing in me at the time that I, personally, was in a rut and needed an injection of intellectual stimulation from new sources to continue to be productive." He turned his attention to the visual system, focusing on human eye movement and color perception. In 1968, Festinger returned to his native New York City, continuing his perception research at The New School, then known as the New School for Social Research. In 1979, he closed his laboratory, citing dissatisfaction with working "on narrower and narrower technical problems."

=== Later life ===
Writing in 1983, four years after closing his laboratory, Festinger expressed a sense of disappointment with what he and his field had accomplished:

Forty years in my own life seems like a long time to me and while some things have been learned about human beings and human behavior during this time, progress has not been rapid enough; nor has the new knowledge been impressive enough. And even worse, from a broader point of view we do not seem to have been working on many of the important problems.

Festinger subsequently began exploring prehistoric archaeological data, meeting with Stephen Jay Gould to discuss ideas and visiting archaeological sites to investigate primitive toolmaking firsthand. His efforts eventually culminated in the book, The Human Legacy, which examined how humans evolved and developed complex societies. Although seemingly the product of a disillusioned, wholesale abandonment of the field of psychology, Festinger considered this research as a return to the fundamental concerns of psychology. He described the goal of his new research interests as "see[ing] what can be inferred from different vantage points, from different data realms, about the nature, the characteristics, of this species we call human," and felt bemused when fellow psychologists asked him how his new research interests were related to psychology.

Festinger's next and final enterprise was to understand why an idea is accepted or rejected by a culture, and he decided that examining why new technology was adopted quickly in the West but not in the Eastern Byzantine Empire would illuminate the issue. However, Festinger was diagnosed with cancer before he was able to publish this material. He decided not to pursue treatment, and died on February 11, 1989.

== Work ==
=== Proximity effect ===
Festinger, Stanley Schachter, and Kurt Back examined the choice of friends among college students living in married student housing at MIT. The team showed that the formation of ties was predicted by propinquity, the physical proximity between where students lived, and not just by similar tastes or beliefs as conventional wisdom assumed. In other words, people simply tend to befriend their neighbors. They also found that functional distance predicted social ties as well. For example, in a two-storey apartment building, people living on the lower floor next to a stairway are functionally closer to upper-floor residents than are others living on the same lower floor. The lower-floor residents near the stairs are more likely than their lower-floor neighbors to befriend those living on the upper floor. Festinger and his collaborators viewed these findings as evidence that friendships often develop based on passive contacts (e.g., brief meetings made as a result of going to and from home within the student housing community) and that such passive contacts are more likely to occur given closer physical and functional distance between people.

=== Informal social communication ===
In his 1950 paper, Festinger postulated that one of the major pressures to communicate arises from uniformity within a group, which in turn arises from two sources: social reality and group locomotion. Festinger argued that people depend on social reality to determine the subjective validity of their attitudes and opinions, and that they look to their reference group to establish social reality; an opinion or attitude is therefore valid to the extent that it is similar to that of the reference group. He further argued that pressures to communicate arise when discrepancies in opinions or attitudes exist among members of a group, and laid out a series of hypotheses regarding determinants of when group members communicate, with whom they communicate, and how recipients of communication react, citing existing experimental evidence to support his arguments.

Festinger labeled communications arising from such pressures toward uniformity as "instrumental communication" in that the communication is not an end in itself but a means to reduce discrepancies between the communicator and others in the group. Instrumental communication is contrasted with "consummatory communication" where communication is the end, such as emotional expression.

=== Social comparison theory ===
Festinger's influential social comparison theory (1954) can be viewed as an extension of his prior theory related to the reliance on social reality for evaluating attitudes and opinions to the realm of abilities. Starting with the premise that humans have an innate drive to accurately evaluate their opinions and abilities, Festinger postulated that people will seek to evaluate their opinions and abilities by comparing them with those of others. Specifically, people will seek out others who are close to one's own opinions and abilities for comparison because accurate comparisons are difficult when others are too divergent from those of oneself. To use Festinger's example, a chess novice does not compare his chess abilities to those of recognized chess masters, nor does a college student compare his intellectual abilities to those of a toddler.

People will, moreover, take action to reduce discrepancies in attitudes, whether by changing others to bring them closer to oneself or by changing one's own attitudes to bring them closer to others. They will likewise take action to reduce discrepancies in abilities, for which there is an upward drive to improve one's abilities. Thus Festinger suggested that the "social influence processes and some kinds of competitive behavior are both manifestations of the same socio-psychological process...[namely,] the drive for self evaluation and the necessity for such evaluation being based on comparison with other persons." Festinger also discussed implications of social comparison theory for society, hypothesizing that the tendency for people to move into groups that hold opinions which agree with their own and abilities that are near their own results in the segmentation of society into groups which are relatively alike.

In his 1954 paper, Festinger again systematically set forth a series of hypotheses, corollaries, and derivations, and he cited existing experimental evidence where available. He stated his main set of hypotheses as follows:

1. There exists, in the human organism, a drive to evaluate his opinion and abilities.
2. To the extent that objective, nonsocial means are available, people evaluate their opinions and abilities by comparison respectively with the opinions and abilities of others.
3. The tendency to compare oneself with some other specific person decreases as the difference between his opinion or ability and one's own increases.
4. There is a unidirectional drive upward in the case of abilities which is largely absent in opinions.
5. There are nonsocial restraints which make it difficult or even impossible to change one's ability. These nonsocial restraints are largely absent for opinions.
6. The cessation of comparison with others is accompanied by hostility or derogation to the extent that continued comparison with those persons implies unpleasant consequences.
7. Any factors which increase the importance of some particular group as a comparison group for some particular opinion or ability will increase the pressure toward uniformity concerning that ability or opinion within that group.
8. If persons who are very divergent from one's own opinion or ability are perceived as different from oneself on attributes consistent with the divergence, the tendency to narrow the range of comparability becomes stronger.
9. When there is a range of opinion or ability in a group, the relative strength of the three manifestations of pressures toward uniformity will be different for those who are close to the mode of the group than those who are distant from the mode. Specifically, those close to the mode of the group will have stronger tendencies to change the positions of others, relatively weaker tendencies to narrow the range of comparison, and much weaker tendencies to change their position compared to those who are distant from the mode of the group.

=== When Prophecy Fails ===
Festinger and his collaborators, Henry Riecken and Stanley Schachter, examined conditions under which disconfirmation of beliefs leads to increased conviction in such beliefs in the 1956 book When Prophecy Fails. The group studied a small apocalyptic cult led by Dorothy Martin (under the pseudonym Marian Keech in the book), a suburban housewife. Martin claimed to have received messages from "the Guardians," a group of superior beings from another planet called 'Clarion.' The messages purportedly said that a flood spreading to form an inland sea stretching from the Arctic Circle to the Gulf of Mexico would destroy the world on December 21, 1954. The three psychologists and several more assistants joined the group. The team observed the group firsthand for months before and after the predicted apocalypse. Many of the group members quit their jobs and disposed of their possessions in preparation for the apocalypse. When doomsday came and went, Martin claimed that the world had been spared because of the "force of Good and light" that the group members had spread. Rather than abandoning their discredited beliefs, group members adhered to them even more strongly and began proselytizing with fervor.

Festinger and his co-authors concluded that the following conditions lead to increased conviction in beliefs following disconfirmation:

1. The belief must be held with deep conviction and be relevant to the believer's actions or behavior.
2. The belief must have produced actions that are arguably difficult to undo.
3. The belief must be sufficiently specific and concerned with the real world such that it can be clearly disconfirmed.
4. The disconfirmatory evidence must be recognized by the believer.
5. The believer must have social support from other believers.

Festinger also later described the increased conviction and proselytizing by cult members after disconfirmation as a specific instantiation of cognitive dissonance (i.e., increased proselytizing reduced dissonance by producing the knowledge that others also accepted their beliefs) and its application to understanding complex, mass phenomena.

The observations reported in When Prophecy Fails were the first experimental evidence for belief perseverance.

=== Cognitive dissonance ===
Festinger's seminal 1957 work integrated existing research literature on influence and social communication under his theory of cognitive dissonance. The theory was motivated by a study of rumors immediately following a severe earthquake in India in 1934. Among people who felt the shock but sustained no damage from the earthquake, rumors were widely circulated and accepted about even worse disasters to come. Although seemingly counter-intuitive that people would choose to believe "fear-provoking" rumors, Festinger reasoned that these rumors were actually "fear-justifying." The rumors functioned to reduce the inconsistency of people's feelings of fear despite not directly experiencing the effects of the earthquake by giving people a reason to be fearful.

Festinger described the basic hypotheses of cognitive dissonance as follows:

1. The existence of dissonance [or inconsistency], being psychologically uncomfortable, will motivate the person to try to reduce the dissonance and achieve consonance [or consistency].
2. When dissonance is present, in addition to trying to reduce it, the person will actively avoid situations and information which would likely increase the dissonance.

Dissonance reduction can be achieved by changing cognition by changing actions, or selectively acquiring new information or opinions. To use Festinger's example of a smoker who has knowledge that smoking is bad for his health, the smoker may reduce dissonance by choosing to quit smoking, by changing his thoughts about the effects of smoking (e.g., smoking is not as bad for your health as others claim), or by acquiring knowledge pointing to the positive effects of smoking (e.g., smoking prevents weight gain).

Festinger and James M. Carlsmith published their classic cognitive dissonance experiment in 1959. In the experiment, subjects were asked to perform an hour of boring and monotonous tasks (i.e., repeatedly filling and emptying a tray with 12 spools and turning 48 square pegs in a board clockwise). Some subjects, who were led to believe that their participation in the experiment had concluded, were then asked to perform a favor for the experimenter by telling the next participant, who was actually a confederate, that the task was extremely enjoyable. Dissonance was created for the subjects performing the favor, as the task was in fact boring. Half of the paid subjects were given $1 for the favor, while those of the other half received $20. As predicted by Festinger and Carlsmith, those paid $1 reported the task to be more enjoyable than those paid $20. Those paid $1 were forced to reduce dissonance by changing their opinions of the task to produce consonance with their behavior of reporting that the task was enjoyable. The subjects paid $20 experienced less dissonance, as the large payment provided consonance with their behavior; they therefore rated the task as less enjoyable and their ratings were similar to those who were not asked to perform the dissonance-causing favor.

Later research provides alternative explanations for these results. Bem suggested that individuals could understand their attitudes by reflecting on their own behavior, rather than experiencing psychological discomfort, a process he called self-perception theory. Harmon-Jones and Mills inform that recent neuroscience research shows dissonance related discomfort can be measured in the brain. Vaidis and Bran argue that inconsistent definitions and research methods make it difficult to compare findings across the numerous cognitive dissonance studies.

=== Statistical hypothesis testing ===
Beyond his seminal work on cognitive dissonance, Leon Festinger also made a notable, though less frequently cited, contribution to the field of non-parametric statistics. In 1946, he published an independent formulation of a rank-sum test used to compare the distributions of two independent samples. While the test is rarely attributed to him in modern textbooks, this procedure is statistically equivalent to the widely known Wilcoxon rank-sum test (published by Wilcoxon in 1945) and the Mann–Whitney U test (published by Mann and Whitney in 1947).

== Legacy ==
Social comparison theory and cognitive dissonance have been described by other psychologists as "the two most fruitful theories in social psychology." Cognitive dissonance has been variously described as "social psychology's most notable achievement," "the most important development in social psychology to date," and a theory without which "social psychology would not be what it is today." Cognitive dissonance spawned decades of related research, from studies focused on further theoretical refinement and development to domains as varied as decision making, the socialization of children, and color preference.

In addition, Festinger is credited with the ascendancy of laboratory experimentation in social psychology as one who "converted the experiment into a powerful scientific instrument with a central role in the search for knowledge." An obituary published by the American Psychologist stated that it was "doubtful that experimental psychology would exist at all" without Festinger. Yet it seems that Festinger was wary about burdensome demands for greater empirical precision. Warning against the dangers of such demands when theoretical concepts are not yet fully developed, Festinger stated, "Research can increasingly address itself to minor unclarities in prior research rather than to larger issues; people can lose sight of the basic problems because the field becomes defined by the ongoing research." He also stressed that laboratory experimentation "cannot exist by itself," but that "there should be an active interrelation between laboratory experimentation and the study of real-life situations." Also, while Festinger is praised for his theoretical rigor and experimental approach to social psychology, he is regarded as having contributed to "the estrangement between basic and applied social psychology in the United States." He "became a symbol of the tough-minded, theory-oriented, pure experimental scientist," while Ron Lippitt, a fellow faculty member at Lewin's Research Center for Group Dynamics with whom Festinger often clashed, "became a symbol of the fuzzy-minded, do-gooder, practitioner of applied social psychology."

One of the greatest impacts of Festinger's studies lies in their "depict[ion] of social behavior as the responses of a thinking organism continually acting to bring order into his world, rather than as the blind impulses of a creature of emotion and habit," as cited in his Distinguished Scientific Contribution Award. Behaviorism, which had dominated psychology until that time, characterized man as a creature of habit conditioned by stimulus-response reinforcement processes. Behaviorists focused only on the observable, i.e., behavior and external rewards, with no reference to cognitive or emotional processes. Theories like cognitive dissonance could not be explained in behaviorist terms. For example, liking was simply a function of reward according to behaviorism, so greater reward would produce greater liking; Festinger and Carlsmith's experiment clearly demonstrated greater liking with lower reward, a result that required the acknowledgement of cognitive processes. With Festinger's theories and the research that they generated, "the monolithic grip that reinforcement theory had held on social psychology was effectively and permanently broken."

== Works ==
- Allyn, J., & Festinger, L. (1961). Effectiveness of Unanticipated Persuasive Communications. Journal of Abnormal and Social Psychology, 62(1), 35–40.
- Back, K., Festinger, L., Hymovitch, B., Kelley, H., Schachter, S., & Thibaut, J. (1950). The methodology of studying rumor transmission. Human Relations, 3(3), 307–312.
- Brehm, J., & Festinger, L. (1957). Pressures toward uniformity of performance in groups. Human Relations, 10(1), 85–91.
- Cartwright, D., & Festinger, L. (1943). A quantitative theory of decision. Psychological Review, 50, 595–621.
- Coren, S., & Festinger, L. (1967). Alternative view of the "Gibson normalization effect". Perception & Psychophysics, 2(12), 621–626.
- Festinger, L. (1942a). A theoretical interpretation of shifts in level of aspiration. Psychological Review, 49, 235–250.
- Festinger, L. (1942b). Wish, expectation, and group standards as factors influencing level of aspiration. Journal of Abnormal and Social Psychology, 37, 184–200.
- Festinger, L. (1943a). Development of differential appetite in the rat. Journal of Experimental Psychology, 32(3), 226–234.
- Festinger, L. (1943b). An exact test of significance for means of samples drawn from populations with an exponential frequency distribution. Psychometrika, 8, 153–160.
- Festinger, L. (1943c). A statistical test for means of samples from skew populations. Psychometrika, 8, 205–210.
- Festinger, L. (1943d). Studies in decision: I. Decision-time, relative frequency of judgment and subjective confidence as related to physical stimulus difference. Journal of Experimental Psychology, 32(4), 291–306.
- Festinger, L. (1943e). Studies in decision: II. An empirical test of a quantitative theory of decision. Journal of Experimental Psychology, 32(5), 411–423.
- Festinger, L. (1946). The significance of difference between means without reference to the frequency distribution function. Psychometrika, 11(2), 97–105.
- Festinger, L. (1947a). The role of group belongingness in a voting situation. Human Relations, 1(2), 154–180.
- Festinger, L. (1947b). The treatment of qualitative data by scale analysis. Psychological Bulletin, 44(2), 149–161.
- Festinger, L. (1949). The analysis of sociograms using matrix algebra. Human Relations, 2(2), 153–158.
- Festinger, L. (1950). Informal social communication. Psychological Review, 57(5), 271–282.
- Festinger, L. (1950b). Psychological Statistics. Psychometrika, 15(2), 209–213.
- Festinger, L. (1951). Architecture and group membership. Journal of Social Issues, 7(1–2), 152–163.
- Festinger, L. (1952). Some consequences of de-individuation in a group. Journal of Abnormal and Social Psychology, 47(2), 382–389.
- Festinger, L. (1954). A theory of social comparison processes. Human Relations, 7, 117–140.
- Festinger, L. (1955a). Handbook of social psychology, vol 1, Theory and method, vol 2, Special fields and applications. Journal of Applied Psychology, 39(5), 384–385.
- Festinger, L. (1955b). Social psychology and group processes. Annual Review of Psychology, 6, 187–216.
- Festinger, L. (1957). A Theory of Cognitive Dissonance. Stanford, CA: Stanford University Press.
- Festinger, L. (1959a). Sampling and related problems in research methodology. American Journal of Mental Deficiency, 64(2), 358–369.
- Festinger, L. (1959b). Some attitudinal consequences of forced decisions. Acta Psychologica, 15, 389–390.
- Festinger, L. (1961). The psychological effects of insufficient rewards. American Psychologist, 16(1), 1–11.
- Festinger, L. (1962). Cognitive dissonance. Scientific American, 207(4), 93–107.
- Festinger, L. (1964). Behavioral support for opinion change. Public Opinion Quarterly, 28(3), 404–417.
- Festinger, L. (Ed.). (1980). Retrospections on Social Psychology. Oxford: Oxford University Press.
- Festinger, L. (1983). The Human Legacy. New York: Columbia University Press.
- Festinger, L. (1981). Human nature and human competence. Social Research, 48(2), 306–321.
- Festinger, L., & Canon, L. K. (1965). Information about spatial location based on knowledge about efference. Psychological Review, 72(5), 373–384.
- Festinger, L., & Carlsmith, J. M. (1959). Cognitive consequences of forced compliance. The Journal of Abnormal and Social Psychology, 58(2), 203–210.
- Festinger, L., Cartwright, D., Barber, K., Fleischl, J., Gottsdanker, J., Keysen, A., & Leavitt, G. (1948). A study of rumor transition: Its origin and spread. Human Relations, 1(4), 464–486.
- Festinger, L., Gerard, H., Hymovitch, B., Kelley, H. H., & Raven, B. (1952). The influence process in the presence of extreme deviates. Human Relations, 5(4), 327–346.
- Festinger, L., & Holtzman, J. D. (1978). Retinal image smear as a source of information about magnitude of eye-movement. Journal of Experimental Psychology-Human Perception and Performance, 4(4), 573–585.
- Festinger, L., & Hutte, H. A. (1954). An experimental investigation of the effect of unstable interpersonal relations in a group. Journal of Abnormal and Social Psychology, 49(4), 513–522.
- Festinger, L., & Katz, D. (Eds.). (1953). Research methods in the behavioral sciences. New York, NY: Dryden.
- Festinger, L., & Maccoby, N. (1964). On resistance to persuasive communications. Journal of Abnormal and Social Psychology, 68(4), 359–366.
- Festinger, L., Riecken, H. W., & Schachter, S. (1956). When Prophecy Fails. Minneapolis, MN: University of Minnesota Press.
- Festinger, L., Schachter, S., & Back, K. (1950). Social Pressures in Informal Groups: A Study of Human Factors in Housing. Stanford, CA: Stanford University Press.
- Festinger, L., Sedgwick, H. A., & Holtzman, J. D. (1976). Visual-perception during smooth pursuit eye-movements. Vision Research, 16(12), 1377–1386.
- Festinger, L., & Thibaut, J. (1951). Interpersonal communication in small groups. Journal of Abnormal and Social Psychology, 46(1), 92–99.
- Festinger, L., Torrey, J., & Willerman, B. (1954). Self-evaluation as a function of attraction to the group. Human Relations, 7(2), 161–174.
- Hertzman, M., & Festinger, L. (1940). Shifts in explicit goals in a level of aspiration experiment. Journal of Experimental Psychology, 27(4), 439–452.
- Hochberg, J., & Festinger, L. (1979). Is there curvature adaptation not attributable to purely intravisual phenomena. Behavioral and Brain Sciences, 2(1), 71–71.
- Hoffman, P. J., Festinger, L., & Lawrence, D. H. (1954). Tendencies toward group comparability in competitive bargaining. Human Relations, 7(2), 141–159.
- Holtzman, J. D., Sedgwick, H. A., & Festinger, L. (1978). Interaction of perceptually monitored and unmonitored efferent commands for smooth pursuit eye movements. Vision Research, 18(11), 1545–1555.
- Komoda, M. K., Festinger, L., & Sherry, J. (1977). The accuracy of two-dimensional saccades in the absence of continuing retinal stimulation. Vision Research, 17(10), 1231–1232.
- Miller, J., & Festinger, L. (1977). Impact of oculomotor retraining on visual-perception of curvature. Journal of Experimental Psychology-Human Perception and Performance, 3(2), 187–200.
- Schachter, S., Festinger, L., Willerman, B., & Hyman, R. (1961). Emotional disruption and industrial productivity. Journal of Applied Psychology, 45(4), 201–213.

== See also ==
- Elliot Aronson
- The Great Disappointment
