= Henry Riecken =

American psychologist

Henry William Riecken (November 11, 1917 – December 27, 2012) was an American psychologist.

== Biography ==
Riecken was born on November 11, 1917, and was raised in Brooklyn. He obtained a bachelor's degree from Harvard University in 1939, and completed a master's degree in psychology from the University of Connecticut in 1941. Following his service in the United States Army Air Forces in the midst of World War II, Riecken earned a doctorate from the Harvard University Department of Social Relations in 1949. He began teaching at Harvard upon finishing his doctoral studies and later joined the University of Minnesota faculty.He is one of the co-authors of When Prophecy Fails, the pioneering study of a UFO cult that laid the groundwork for the theory of cognitive dissonance. Riecken left Minnesota for Washington, D. C. in 1958, where he became the first director of the social science division of the National Science Foundation. Between 1966 and 1968, Riecken was vice president of the Social Science Research Council, and succeeded Edward Pendleton Herring as president in 1968, serving in that position until 1971. The next year, Riecken joined the University of Pennsylvania faculty. He taught at Penn as the Francis Boyer Professor of Behavioral Sciences until 1985. Riecken returned to Washington D. C. as adviser to the Council on Library Resources and other nonprofit, educational organizations. He was a fellow of the American Psychological Society and the American Association for the Advancement of Science.

Riecken was married to Frances Manson Brown from 1955 to her death in 2011. The couple had three children. Henry Riecken died of intestinal cancer on December 27, 2012, at an assisted living facility in Washington, D. C. He was 95.
