= Emotionality =

Physiological and behavioral responses to emotional stimuli

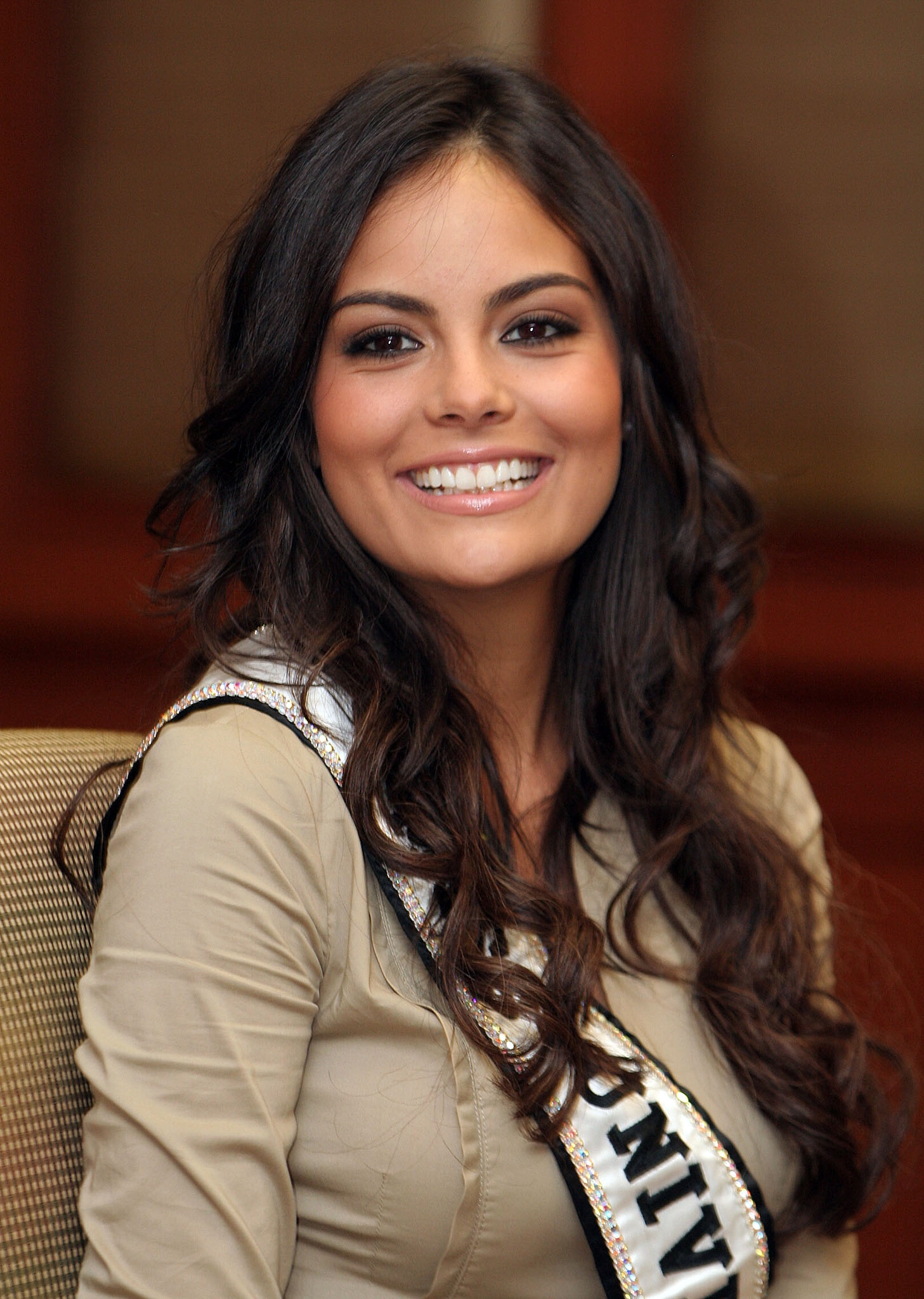
Smile, depicting joy (Ximena Navarrete, Miss Universe 2010)

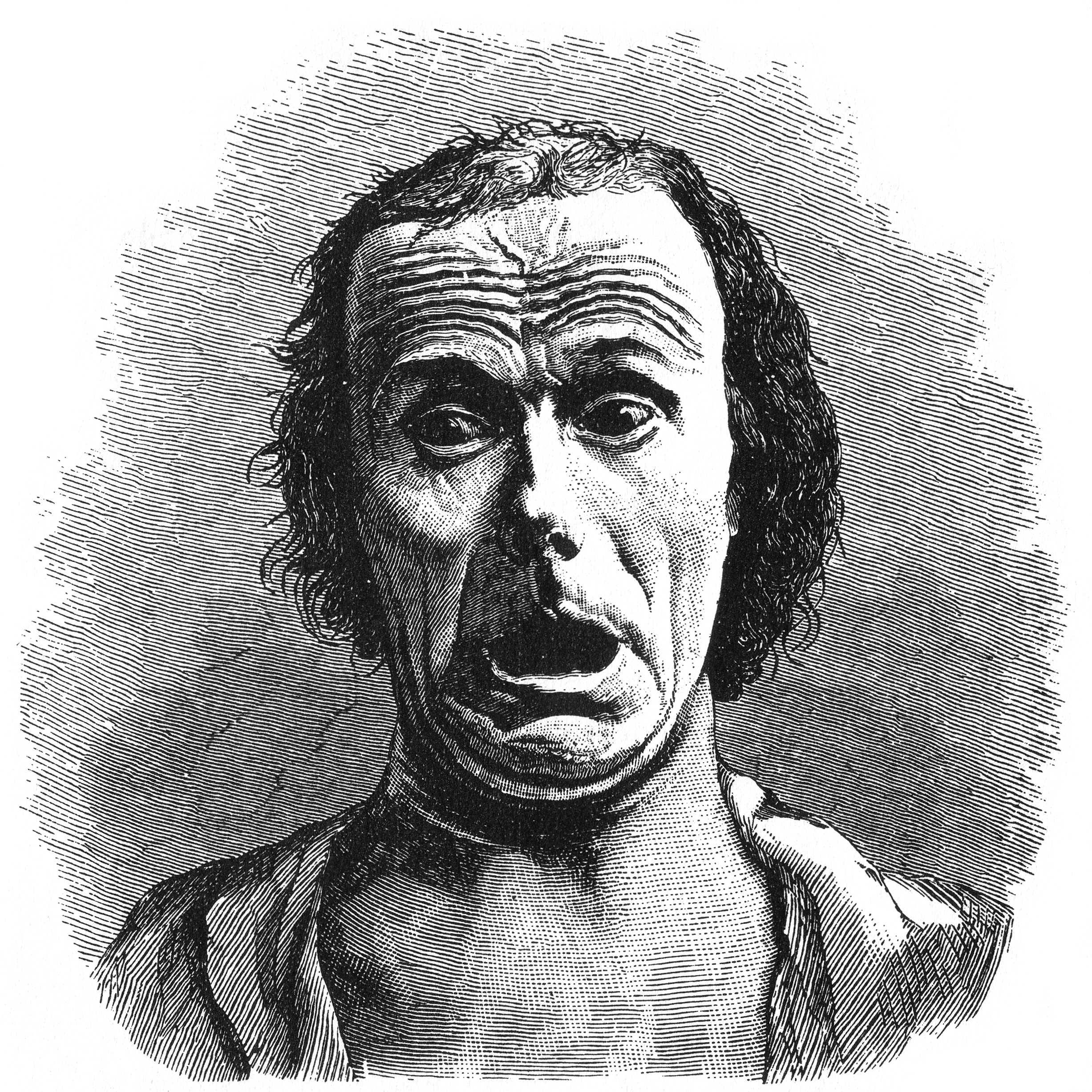
Wide eyes and raised eyebrows are common indicators of surprise (Figure 20 from Charles Darwin's The Expression of the Emotions in Man and Animals)

Emotionality is the observable behavioral and physiological component of emotion. It is a measure of a person's emotional reactivity to a stimulus. Most of these responses can be observed by other people, while some emotional responses can only be observed by the person experiencing them. Observable responses to emotion (i.e., smiling) do not have a single meaning. A smile can be used to express happiness or anxiety, while a frown can communicate sadness or anger. Emotionality is often used by experimental psychology researchers to operationalize emotion in research studies.

== Early theories ==
By the late 19th century, many high-quality contributions became interested in analyzing emotion because of the works of psychologists and scientists such as Wilhelm Wundt, George Stout, William McDougall, William James, and George Herbert Mead. William James preferred to focus on the physiological aspects of emotional response, although he did not disregard the perceptual or cognitive components. William McDougall thought of emotion as the articulation of a natural response built on instinct. Other psychologists reasoned that although gestures express emotion, this is not the entirety of their function. Wundt analyzed that emotion portrays both expression and communication.

=== As irrational ===
One of the oldest views of emotion is that emotion indicates inferiority. In early psychology, it was believed that passion (emotion) was a part of the soul inherited from the animals and that it must be controlled. Solomon identified that in the Romantic movement of the eighteenth and nineteenth centuries, reason and emotion were discovered to be opposites.

=== As physiological ===
Physiological responses to emotion originate in the central nervous system, the autonomic nervous system, and the endocrine system. Some of the responses include: heart rate, sweating, rate and depth of respiration, and electrical activity in the brain. Many researchers have attempted to find a connection between specific emotions and a corresponding pattern of physiological responses, but the results have been inconclusive.

== Later theories ==
The significant theories of emotion can be divided into three primary categories: physiological, neurological, and cognitive. Physiological theories imply that activity within the body can be accountable for emotions. Neurological theories suggest that activity within the brain leads to emotional responses. Lastly, cognitive theories reason that thoughts and other mental activity have a vital role in the stimulation of emotions. Common sense suggests that people first become consciously aware of their emotions and that the physiological responses follow shortly after. Theories by James-Lange, Cannon-Bard, and Schachter-Singer contradict the common-sense theory.

=== James-Lange ===
The James-Lange theory of emotion was proposed by psychologist William James and physiologist Carl Lange. This theory suggests that emotions occur as a result of physiological responses to outside stimuli or events. For example, this theory suggests that if someone is driving down the road and sees the headlights of another car heading toward them in their lane, their heart begins to race (a physiological response) and then they become afraid (fear being the emotion).

=== Cannon-Bard ===
The Cannon-Bard theory, which was conceptualized by Walter Cannon and Phillip Bard, suggests that emotions and their corresponding physiological responses are experienced simultaneously. Using the previous example, when someone sees the car coming toward them in their lane, their heart starts to race and they feel afraid at the same time.

=== Schachter-Singer ===
Stanley Schachter and Jerome Singer proposed a theory also known as the two-factor theory of emotion, which implies emotion have two factors: physical arousal and cognitive label. This suggests that if the physiological activity occurs first, then it must cognitively be distinguished as the cause of the arousal and labeled as an emotion. Using the example of someone seeing a car coming towards them in their lane, their heart would start to race and they would identify that they must be afraid if their heart is racing, and from there they would begin to feel fear.

== Gender differences ==
The opposition of rational thought and emotion is believed to be paralleled by the similar opposition between male and female. A traditional view is that "men are seen as rational and women as emotional, lacking rationality." However, in spite of these ideas, and in spite of gender differences in the prevalence of mood disorders, the empirical evidence on gender differences in emotional responding is mixed.

When engaging in social interaction, studies show that women smile significantly more than men do. It is difficult to determine the exact difference between males and females to explain this disparity. It is possible that this difference in expression of emotions is due to societal influences and conformity to gender roles. However, this may not fully explain why men smile less than women do.

The male gender role involves characteristics such as strength, expert knowledge, and a competitive nature. Smiling may be stereotypically associated with weakness. Men may feel that if they engage in this perceived weakness, it may contradict their attempts to show strength and other traits of the male gender role. Another broad explanation for the contrast in male and female gender expression is that women have reported to experience greater levels of emotional intensity than men, in both positive and negative aspects, which could naturally lead to greater emotional response. It has also been reported that men are more likely to confide in female companions, revealing their emotions and intimacy, while females are typically comfortable confiding in both genders. This suggests that men are more particular about how they express the emotions they feel, potentially relating back to gender roles.

== Across cultures ==
There are six universal emotions which expand across all cultures. These emotions are happiness, sadness, anger, fear, surprise, and disgust. Debate exists about whether contempt should be combined with disgust. According to Ekman (1992), each of these emotions have universally corresponding facial expressions as well.

In addition to the facial expressions that are said to accompany each emotion, there is also evidence to suggest that certain autonomic nervous system (ANS) activity is associated with the three emotions of fear, anger, and disgust. Ekman theorizes that these specific emotions are associated with the universal physiological responses due to evolution. It would not be expected to observe the same physiological responses for emotions not specifically linked to survival, such as happiness or sadness.

Ekman's theories were early challenged by James A. Russell, and have since been tested by a variety of researchers, with ambiguous results. This seems to reflect methodological problems relating to both display rules and to the components of emotion. Current thinking favors a mix of underlying universality combined with significant cultural differences in the articulation and expression of emotion. Emotions serve different functions in different cultures.

== Positive ==
Positive emotionality is the ability to control positive mood and emotions, people with positive emotions seek for social reward. Positive emotionality can be a preventive factor in blocking out certain types of mental illness. In a study of a sample of 1,655 youth (54% girls; 7– 16 years), it found that the higher their positive emotionality was, the lower their depression would be. Depression was considered by its definition of the inability to receive positive emotions or pleasure. The youth's temperament, adaptive emotion regulation (ER) strategies, and depressive symptoms were determined through a questionnaire. The study also reported that depressive symptoms could be reduced through emotion regulation of positive mood. A study by Charles T. Taylor et al. linked being exposed to positive emotions before a surgery to less anxiety and a decrease in having symptoms after treatment.

== Negative ==
Negative emotionality is the opposite of positive emotionality. People are unable to control their positive mood and emotions. Everyone experiences negative emotionality in different levels, there are different factors that effect each individual in a different way. Negative emotionality effects many aspects of our lives in terms of coping and the relationship that people share with one another. Neuroticism (Big Five/HEXACO) is one of the biggest factors found in negative emotionality. Someone on the higher spectrum of neuroticism is often more anxious and enjoy the feelings of their negative emotion. Some research suggests that obese children compared to children who are not obese have higher levels of negative emotionality and the ability to control emotions.

== See also ==
- Affect display
- Emotions and culture
- Regulation of emotion
