= Low arousal =

Low arousal most likely refers to when a person is in a state of low arousal.

It can also refer to:

- Low arousal approach, deals with how staff handles patients who are easily provoked
- Low arousal theory, explains that individuals who have antisocial personality disorder or ADHD seek excessive activity to combat a state of low arousal
- Various forms of Sexual dysfunction
