= Valins effect =

Psychological experiment

The Valins Effect is a conscious sense of physiological changes when an emotional response is actualized.

Psychologist Stuart Valins conducted an experiment in 1966 on the perception of one's own degree of activation. Valins thus modified the two-factor theory of emotion of Schachter and Singer. According to the Valins theory, the actual physiological arousal or the sensation of arousal is not necessary for the emergence of emotions, but the cognitive representation about one's own arousal is sufficient for the emergence of emotions.

== Experiment ==
In the experiment, Valins showed ten pictures of attractive, half-naked women (then Playboy photos) in two passes to male subjects. The participants in the experimental group were connected before the start of the experiment to an apparatus which allegedly recorded their heartbeat. At the same time, the subjects received the feigned feedback of their heartbeat rate via headphones. However, the distorted heart rhythm recorded via headphones was not his own. The experimenter previously determined which photos showed a slowing or increasing heartbeat. The perception of a reduced or increasing state of excitation should thus be simulated.

In the control group, the subjects also heard the same sounds when viewing the photos through headphones. However, they were presented by the experimenter as meaningless or disturbing background noise. At the end of the experiment, the subjects should evaluate the individual photos in a questionnaire according to attractiveness (scale). In addition, the participants could again select some photos that they took home. The subsequent evaluation showed that there was a coupling between the change in heart rate and the attractiveness ratings. The perceived excitement of the subjects made an influence on the assessment.

== Criticism ==
The Valins effect has since been checked several times. The studies in different areas came to the same results. But there was also criticism, because the Valins effect also appeared under other conditions. Further points of criticism were that the subjects may have reacted to the so - called "demand characteristics" and that there may have been differences in attention in the experimental or control group. Some critics objected to the emotion index. From their point of view, the attractiveness rating scale and image choices were questionable emotion indicators.

== See also ==
Experimental psychology
