= Yerkes–Dodson law =

Relationship between stress and performance

Original data from which the Yerkes–Dodson law was derived

Hebbian version of the Yerkes–Dodson law (this version leaves out that hyperarousal does not adversely impact simple tasks). This version is the most common version and often incorrectly cited in textbooks.

Original Yerkes–Dodson law

The Yerkes–Dodson law is an empirical relationship between arousal and performance, originally developed by psychologists Robert M. Yerkes and John Dillingham Dodson and published, in 1908, in the Journal of Comparative Neurology and Psychology. The law dictates that performance increases with physiological or mental arousal, but only up to a point. When levels of arousal become too high, performance decreases. The process is often illustrated graphically as a bell-shaped curve which increases and then decreases with higher levels of arousal. The original paper (a study of the Japanese house mouse, described as the "dancing mouse") was only referenced ten times over the next half century, yet in four of the citing articles, these findings were described as a psychological "law".

== Levels of arousal ==
Researchers have found that different tasks require different levels of arousal for optimal performance. For example, difficult or intellectually demanding tasks may require a lower level of arousal (to facilitate concentration), whereas tasks demanding stamina or persistence may be performed better with higher levels of arousal (to increase motivation).

Because of task differences, the shape of the curve can be highly variable. For simple or well-learned tasks, the relationship is monotonic, and performance improves as arousal increases. For complex, unfamiliar, or difficult tasks, the relationship between arousal and performance reverses after a point, and performance thereafter declines as arousal increases.

The effect of task difficulty led to the hypothesis that the Yerkes–Dodson Law can be decomposed into two distinct factors as in a bathtub curve. The upward part of the inverted U can be thought of as the energizing effect of arousal. The downward part is caused by negative effects of arousal (or stress) on cognitive processes like attention (e.g., "tunnel vision"), memory, and problem-solving.

There has been research indicating that the correlation suggested by Yerkes and Dodson exists (such as that of Broadhurst (1959), Duffy (1957), and Anderson et al (1988)), but a cause of the correlation has not yet successfully been established (Anderson, Revelle, & Lynch, 1989).

== Alternative models ==
Other theories and models of arousal do not affirm the Hebb or Yerkes-Dodson curve. The widely supported theory of optimal flow presents a less simplistic understanding of arousal and skill-level match. Reversal theory actively opposes the Yerkes-Dodson law by demonstrating how the psyche operates on the principle bistability rather than homeostasis.

== Relationship to glucocorticoids ==
A 2007 review by Lupien at al of the effects of stress hormones (glucocorticoids, GC) and human cognition revealed that memory performance vs. circulating levels of glucocorticoids does manifest an upside-down U-shaped curve, and the authors noted the resemblance to the Yerkes–Dodson curve. For example, long-term potentiation (LTP) (the process of forming long-term memories) is optimal when glucocorticoid levels are mildly elevated, whereas significant decreases of LTP are observed after adrenalectomy (low GC state) or after exogenous glucocorticoid administration (high GC state).
This review also revealed that in order for a situation to induce a stress response, it has to be interpreted as one or more of the following:

- novel
- unpredictable
- not controllable by the individual
- a social evaluative threat (negative social evaluation possibly leading to social rejection).

It has also been shown that elevated levels of glucocorticoids enhance memory for emotionally arousing events but lead more often than not to poor memory for material unrelated to the source of stress/emotional arousal.

== See also ==
- Drive theory – Psychological theory
- Emotion – Conscious subjective experience
- Emotion and memory – Critical factors contributing to the emotional enhancement effect on human memory
- Flashbulb memory – Type of vivid, enduring autobiographical memory
- Low arousal theory – Psychological theory
