= Cannon–Bard theory =

Psyschological theory

The thalamic region of the brain.

The main concepts of the Cannon–Bard theory are that emotional expression results from the function of hypothalamic structures, and emotional feeling results from stimulations of the dorsal thalamus. The physiological changes and subjective feeling of an emotion in response to a stimulus are separate and independent; arousal does not have to occur before the emotion. Thus, the thalamic region is attributed a major role in this theory of emotion. The theory is therefore also referred to as the thalamic theory of emotion.

== Origins ==
Walter Bradford Cannon (1871–1945) was a physiologist at Harvard University, who is perhaps best known for his classic treatise on homeostasis. Philip Bard (1898–1977) was a doctoral student of Cannon's, and together they developed a model of emotion called the Cannon–Bard Theory. Cannon was an experimenter who relied on studies of jainam somaiyas

physiology. Through these studies, Cannon and Bard highlighted the role of the brain in generating physiological responses and feelings; a role that is important in their explanation of emotion experience and production.

A dominant theory of emotion of Cannon's time was the James–Lange theory of emotion, and Cannon recognized that to test this theory, an examination of emotional expression with no visceral afferent feedback was required. This was necessary because the link between visceral changes and the feedback required to stimulate cerebral manifestations of an emotion would no longer be present. To do so, Cannon experimented with severing afferent nerves of the sympathetic branch of the autonomic nervous system in cats. Cannon compiled his experimental results in 1915, then refined and expanded them, and finally proposed his model of emotion as a challenge and alternative to the James–Lange theory of emotion.

The James–Lange theory relies on the backflow of impulses from the periphery to account for unique emotional experiences; impulses that William James assumed to come from all parts of the organism, including the muscles, skin, and the viscera. The viscera were attributed a major role by James. The viscera are composed of smooth muscle and glands. Cannon identified and outlined five issues with the James–Lange theory's notion of the vasomotor center as the explanation of emotional experience.

1. Total separation of the viscera from the central nervous system does not alter emotional behaviour.
  In an experiment, cats were kept alive and healthy after having their sympathetic nervous systems completely removed. Removal of this system resulted in the abolishment of all the reactions under control of the vasomotor center, the region that the James–Lange theory purported to be responsible for emotional experiences. However, it was found that destroying these functions had little or no effect on the animals' emotional responses. The cats displayed the typical signs of rage in response to a barking dog, and the animals displayed full emotional expression in all organs that had not had their connections to the brain destroyed.
2. The same visceral changes occur in very different emotional states and in non-emotional states.
  The sympathetic nervous system functions as a single unit. Visceral changes brought on/caused by sympathetic nervous system action include: increased heart rate; contraction of arterioles; dilatation of bronchioles; increased levels of blood sugar; sweating; widening of the pupils and erection of hairs; and discharge of adrenaline. These physiological changes can be seen in great excitement under any circumstances, including in distinguishable emotional states such as fear and rage, as well as situations of fever, asphyxia, and exposure to cold temperatures. Cannon articulated that these responses of the viscera are too uniform to offer a means of distinguishing emotions that have varying subjective qualities. He postulated that if emotions were the result of impulses from the viscera, we could expect fear, rage, chilliness, asphyxia, and fever to feel similarly, which is not the case.
3. The viscera are relatively insensitive structures.
  Cannon wrote that there is a common belief that the more deeply the body is penetrated, the more sensitive it becomes; however, this is not the case. In the nerves distributed to the viscera the afferent sensory fibers may be only 1/10th as numerous as the efferent sensory fibers. For example, in the case of the viscera, we are unaware of the contractions and relaxations of the digestive processes. Such processes are undemonstrative and beyond our physical awareness, even when marked changes are induced in them.
4. Visceral changes are too slow to be a source of emotional feeling.
  As previously stated, the viscera are composed of smooth muscle and glands, which are typically sluggish in their responses. It has been found that the latent period of the psychogalvanic response in man is approximately 3 seconds. However, it has also been noted that the latent period of affective responses to photos of men and women can end within 0.8 seconds. The James–Lange theory contends that such affective responses result from reverberations from the viscera. Cannon pointed out that the time required for nerve impulses to travel from the brain to the periphery and back to the brain again could not occur quickly enough to be the cause of such emotional responses.
5. Artificial induction of the visceral changes typical of strong emotions does not produce them.
  When adrenaline is injected it induces the physiological responses typical of sympathetic nervous system activity previously discussed (dilation of bronchioles, constriction of blood vessels, increased blood sugar etc.). These changes are typical of intense emotional states. Therefore, if these visceral changes were artificially induced by the injection of adrenaline, one would expect the emotions to follow, as articulated by the James–Lange theory of emotion. When this experiment was done, participants experienced no specific emotions. However, it was found that an emotional response may develop only when the adrenaline as injected subsequent to discussing with patients their sick children or their dead parents. Thus, injection of adrenaline had an effect when an emotional mood already existed in participants.

== Further criticisms of the James–Lange theory ==
William James argued that there were either special centers for cerebral processes that accompany emotion, or they occurred in the ordinary motor and sensory centers of the cortex. Cannon responded by positing that there may not be one or the other, that there may be cortical processes and special centers that accompany emotional responses. He outlined two ideas regarding the existence of two sources of cerebral processes of emotions.

=== Emotional expression results from action of subcortical centers ===
Cannon summarized research done by Bechterev regarding emotional expression. In this research, it was argued that emotional expression must be independent of the cortex because the expression of emotions cannot always be inhibited or controlled (e.g. laughing from being tickled) because visceral changes occur independent of our control, and because these responses, which cannot be inhibited, are seen soon after birth before cortical management is developed. Furthermore, after cerebral hemispheres were removed from animal test subjects, correct affective responses could be elicited by appropriate stimulations. These emotional effects were no longer present when the optic thalamus was removed from the animals; thus, it was concluded that this region plays a significant role in the expression of emotions.

Location of the human diencephalon (red), a brain area implicated in the sham rage response in cats studied by Cannon and Britton.

To further support the assertion that emotional expression results from action of subcortical centers, Cannon and Britton performed further experimental research with cats. Cats were decorticated, and after a period of recovery they spontaneously displayed the behaviours characteristic of intense fury. This response, referred to as sham rage, continued to be displayed after ablation of all brain regions anterior to the diencephalon. However, once the lower posterior portion of the thalamic region was removed, the display of sham rage by the cats subsided. Based on this finding, it was concluded that the thalamus was a region from which, in the absence of cortical control, impulses are discharged which evoke an extreme degree of "emotional" activity, both muscular and visceral. Based on these findings and observations, Cannon asserts that the optic thalamus is a region in the brain responsible for the neural organization for the different emotional expressions.

=== Thalamic processes are a source of affective experience ===
There are numerous reported and cited cases of patients with unilateral lesions in the thalamus region who have a tendency to react excessively to affective stimuli. For example, pin pricks, painful pressure, and excessive heat or cold all cause more distress on the damaged side of the body as compared to the normal side. Similar results can be observed from agreeable stimuli: warmth stimuli may cause intense pleasure, demonstrated by facial expressions of enjoyment and exclamations of delight by the individual. The increased influence of stimuli resulting in excessive responses was attributed to the release of the thalamus from cortical inhibition. When the thalamus is released from cortical control, the affective states and responses are increased; thus, it was concluded that the thalamic region is occupied with the affective component of sensation.

== The Cannon–Bard theory ==
Location of the human cerebrum (red).

According to Cannon, an external stimulus activates receptors and this excitation starts impulses toward the cortex. Upon arriving in the cortex, the impulses are associated with conditioned processes that determine the direction of the subsequent response. It is this response that stimulates the thalamic processes. Once the thalamic processes are activated, they are ready to discharge. The thalamic neurons fire in a special combination in a given emotional expression. These neurons then discharge precipitately and intensely. Cannon wrote that within and near the thalamus, the neurons responsible for an emotional expression lie close to the relay in the sensory path from the periphery to the cortex, and when these neurons fire in a particular combination they innervate muscles and viscera and excite afferent paths to the cortex by direct connection or irradiation.ra

The key component of the Cannon–Bard theory of emotion is that when the thalamic discharge occurs, the bodily changes occur almost simultaneously with the emotional experience. The bodily changes and emotional experience occur separately and independently of one another; physiological arousal does not have to precede emotional expression or experience. The theory asserts that the thalamic region is the brain area responsible for emotional responses to experienced stimuli.

Cannon summarises the observations that serve as the basis for his theory of emotion which claims the thalamic region is the coordinating center for emotional reactions. First, after the removal of the cerebrum anterior to the thalamus in animal test subjects, the animals continue to display rage-like emotional responses. These reactions cease when the thalamus is then removed. Secondly, a tumor on one side of the thalamus can result in unilateral laughter or grimace under the appropriate conditions, although cortical and voluntary control of the same muscles is bilateral. Lastly, temporary impairment of cortical control of lower centers from light amnesia or permanent impairment by disease (e.g. tumor or lesion) can cause uncontrollable and prolonged weeping or laughing.

== Additional theories of emotion ==
The location of the limbic system, the key brain area in the Papez-MacLean theory of emotion.

The Cannon–Bard theory of emotion was formulated as a challenge and alternative to James–Lange theory. The Papez-Maclean theory is another influential theory of emotion that differs from the Cannon–Bard theory in terms of the area that is considered to be responsible for emotion expression. James Papez initially suggested that the interconnections among structures of the limbic system were ideally constituted to handle the long-lasting, intense aspects of experience that are typically associated with emotion. The circuit originally proposed by Papez consisted of the hippocampus, the ipsilateral mammillary body, the anterior nucleus of the thalamus, the cingulate cortex, the parahippocampal gyrus, and the entorhinal cortex, returning to the hippocampus. MacLean elaborated on Papez's earlier work, adding the prefrontal cortex, the septum, and the amygdala, and named this group of structures the limbic system.

There is also the two-factor theory of emotion, as proposed by Stanley Schachter and Jerome E. Singer.
