= Cognitive theory =

Cognitive theory may refer to:

- Cognitive psychology, the study of mental processes
- Cognitive science
- Theory of cognitive development, Jean Piaget's theory of development and the theories which spawned from it
- Two factor theory of emotion, another cognitive theory
