= The Principles of Psychology =

1890 book by William James

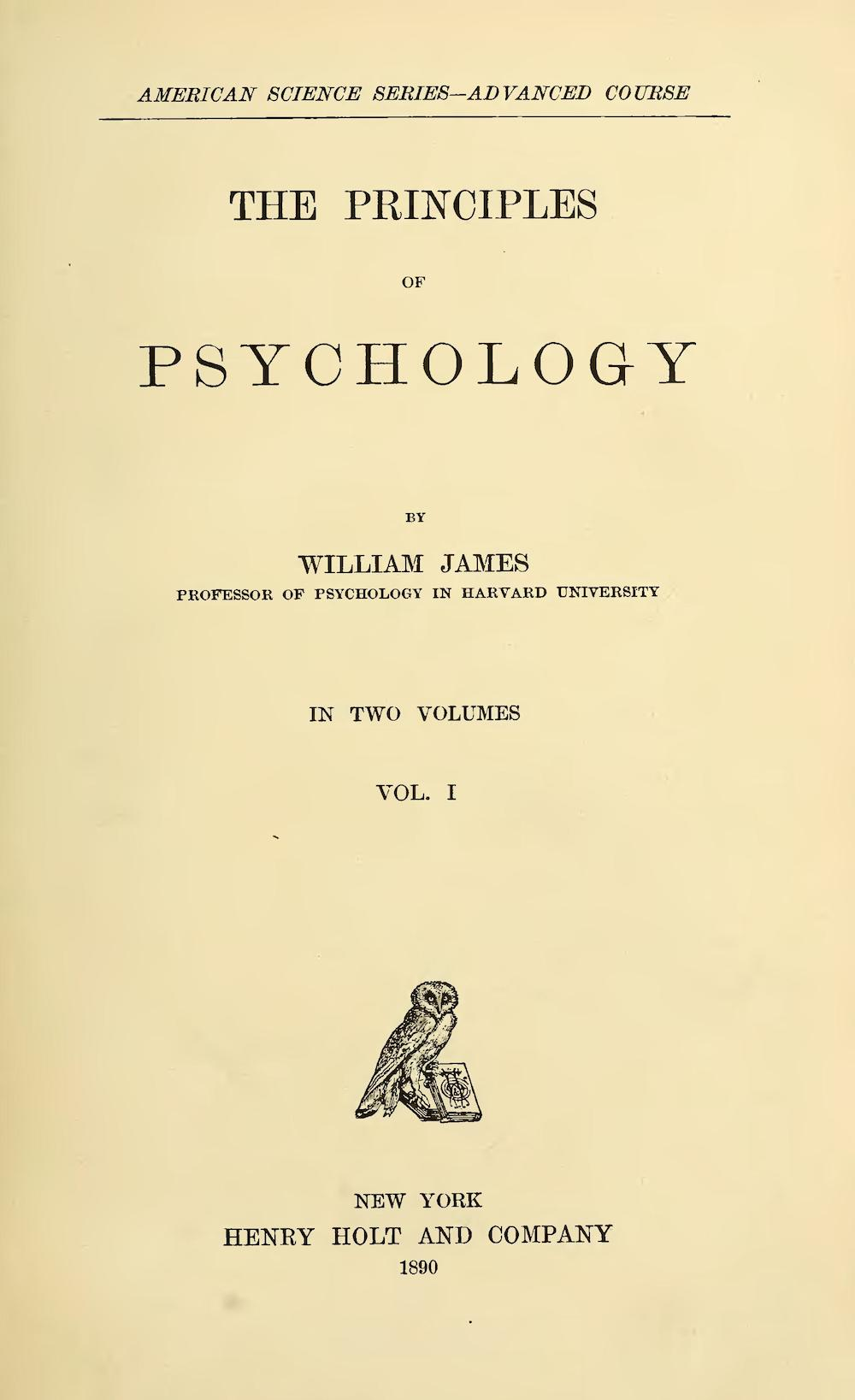
- Title page from the first edition.
- Author: William James
- Language: English
- Subject: Psychology
- Publisher: Henry Holt and Company
- Publication date: 1890
- Publication place: United States
- Media type: Print (Hardcover and Paperback)
- Pages: xviii, 1393

The Principles of Psychology is an 1890 book about psychology by William James, an American philosopher and psychologist who trained to be a physician before going into psychology.

The four key concepts in James' book are: stream of consciousness (his most famous psychological metaphor); emotion (later known as the James–Lange theory); habit (human habits are constantly formed to achieve certain results); and will (through James' personal experiences in life).

== Origins ==
The openings of The Principles of Psychology presented what was known at the time of writing about the localization of functions in the brain: how each sense seemed to have a neural center to which it reported and how varied bodily motions have their sources in other centers.

The particular hypotheses and observations on which James relied are now very dated, but the broadest conclusion to which his material leads is still valid, which was that the functions of the "lower centers" (beneath the cerebrum) become increasingly specialized as one moves from reptiles, through ever more intelligent mammals, to humans while the functions of the cerebrum itself become increasingly flexible and less localized as one moves along the same continuum.

James also discussed experiments on illusions (optical, auditory, etc.) and offered a physiological explanation for many of them, including that "the brain reacts by paths which previous experiences have worn, and makes us usually perceive the probable thing, i.e. the thing by which on previous occasions the reaction was most frequently aroused." Illusions are thus a special case of the phenomenon of habit.

== Key features ==
=== Stream of consciousness ===
Stream of consciousness is arguably James' most famous psychological metaphor. He argued that human thought can be characterized as a flowing stream, which was an innovative concept at the time due to the prior argument being that human thought was more so like a distinct chain. He also believed that humans can never experience exactly the same thought or idea more than once. In addition to this, he viewed consciousness as completely continuous.

=== Emotion ===
James introduced a new theory of emotion (later known as the James–Lange theory), which argued that an emotion is instead the consequence rather than the cause of the bodily experiences associated with its expression. In other words, a stimulus causes a physical response and an emotion follows the response. This theory has received criticism throughout the years since its introduction.

=== Habit ===
Human habits are constantly formed to achieve certain results because of one's strong feelings of wanting or wishing for something. James emphasized the importance and power of human habit and proceeded to draw a conclusion. James noted that the laws of habit formation are unbiased, habits are capable of causing either good or bad actions. And once either a good or bad habit has begun to be established, it is very difficult to change.

=== Will ===
Will is the final chapter of The Principles of Psychology, which was through James' own personal experiences in life. There was one question that troubled James during his crisis, which was whether or not free will existed. "The most essential achievement of the will,... when it is most 'voluntary', is to attend to a difficult object and hold it fast before the mind..." Effort of attention is thus the essential phenomenon of will."

== Use of comparative psychology ==
In the use of the comparative method, James wrote, "instincts of animals are ransacked to throw light on our own...." By this light, James dismisses the platitude that "man differs from lower creatures by the almost total absence of instincts". There is no such absence, so the difference must be found elsewhere.

James believed that humans wielded far more impulses than other creatures. Impulses which, when observed out of their greater context, may have appeared just as automatic as the most basic of animal instincts. However, as man experienced the results of his impulses, and these experiences evoked memories and expectations, those very same impulses became gradually refined.

By this reasoning, William James arrived at the conclusion that in any animal with the capacity for memory, association, and expectation, behavior is ultimately expressed as a synthesis of instinct and experience, rather than just blind instinct alone.

== Influence and reception ==
The Principles of Psychology was a vastly influential textbook which summarized the field of psychology through the time of its publication. Psychology was beginning to gain popularity and acclaim in the United States at this time, and the compilation of this textbook only further solidified psychology's credibility as a science.

... we are disposed heartily to thank Prof. James for all that he has given. Of the 1,400 pages—whose number he himself regards with a modest horror—we do not think we have found one dull, though, perhaps, more than one superfluous.

In 2002, James was listed as the 14th most eminent psychology author of the 20th century, with his theory on emotion (the James-Lange Theory) presented in this book being a contributing factor for that ranking.

In areas outside of psychology, the book was also to have a major impact. The philosopher Edmund Husserl engages specifically with William James's work in many areas. Following Husserl, this work would also impact many other phenomenologists. Furthermore, the Austrian philosopher Ludwig Wittgenstein read James's work and utilized it in his coursework for students, though Wittgenstein held philosophical disagreements about many of James's points. For instance, Wittgenstein's critique of William James in sec 342 of Philosophical Investigations. The book is also referenced in other published writings such as Remarks on the Philosophy of Psychology.

== Editions ==
- James, W. (1890). The Principles of Psychology, in two volumes. New York: Henry Holt and Company.
- James, W. (1950). The Principles of Psychology, 2 volumes in 1. New York: Dover Publications.
- James, W. (1983). The Principles of Psychology, Volumes I and II. Cambridge, MA: Harvard University Press (with introduction by George A. Miller).

== See also ==
- American philosophy
