= Stanley Schachter =

American psychologist (1922–1997)

- Born: April 15, 1922; Flushing, Queens, New York, U.S.
- Died: June 7, 1997 (aged 75); East Hampton, New York, U.S.
- Education: Yale University (BA, MA); University of Michigan (PhD)
- Spouse: Sophia Duckworth
- Children: 1
- Scientific career
- Fields: Psychology
- Workplaces: University of Minnesota; Columbia University
- Thesis: Deviation, rejection, and communication. (1950)
- Doctoral advisor: Leon Festinger
- Doctoral students: Richard E. Nisbett; Lee Ross; Nicholas Christenfeld; E. Tory Higgins; Jerome E. Singer; Bibb Latané; Judith Rodin

Stanley Schachter (April 15, 1922 – June 7, 1997) was an American social psychologist best known for his development of the two factor theory of emotion in 1962 along with Jerome E. Singer. In his theory he states that emotions have two ingredients: physiological arousal and a cognitive label. A person's experience of an emotion stems from the mental awareness of the body's physical arousal and the explanation one attaches to this arousal. Schachter also studied and published many works on the subjects of obesity, group dynamics, birth order and smoking. A Review of General Psychology survey, published in 2002, ranked Schachter as the seventh most cited psychologist of the 20th century.

== Biographical background ==
=== Early life and education ===
Schachter was born in Flushing, New York, the son of Anna (Fruchter) and Nathan Schachter. His parents were both Romanian Jews, his father from Vasilău, a small village in Bukovina, and his mother from Rădăuți. As a young man, Schachter initially studied Art history at Yale University. He obtained his bachelor's degree in 1942, and went on to pursue his Master's in Psychology, also at Yale, where he was influenced by Clark Hull. After earning his Master's in 1944, Schachter joined the United States Armed Forces, where he served until 1946. During his two years in the Armed Forces, Schachter obtained the rank of sergeant. He worked at the Biophysics Division of the Aero-Medical Laboratory of Wright Field in Riverside, Ohio, studying the visual problems experienced by pilots in flight.

In 1946, after his term in the armed forces, Schachter went to the Massachusetts Institute of Technology (MIT) to work with the social psychologist Kurt Lewin, in his Research Center for Group Dynamics, studying social issues. Unfortunately, Lewin died in 1947, very shortly after Schachter's arrival in Cambridge, Massachusetts. A senior doctoral student, Leon Festinger, took over as Schachter's supervisor, and the pair became very close lifelong friends. When Festinger moved to the University of Michigan's Institute for Social Research in 1948, Schachter followed. This was where Schachter gained his Ph.D. in 1949, under supervisor Festinger, writing his dissertation on how individuals with differing opinions who were working in small groups were treated by the members of the group whose opinion matched with the majority.

=== Early career (University of Minnesota 1949–1961) ===
The new doctor of psychology's impressive dissertation earned him a job in 1949 at the University of Minnesota's Laboratory for Research in Social Relations. Beginning as an assistant professor, Schachter soon moved his way through the ranks of professorship; he became an associate professor in 1954 and then obtained the title of full professor in 1958, in large part thanks to his extensive research and writing. During the first decade of his career in psychology, Schachter authored or co-authored five books, four of which (Social Pressures in Informal Groups [1950], Theory and Experiment in Social Communication [1950], When Prophecy Fails [1956] – written with Festinger and Henry Riecken, describing what happened to millennial groups after their predicted date for the end of the world had passed –, and The Psychology of Affiliation [1959]) are still highly influential. In addition to the books, during the 1950s, Schachter also wrote numerous articles on topics such as rumor transmission, group cohesion, and persuasion.

Such work gained Schachter several honors and awards during his time at the University of Minnesota. In 1952, Schachter was awarded a Fulbright Fellowship. Then, in 1959, toward the end of his time in Minnesota, Schachter was awarded both the American Association for the Advancement of Science (AAAS) Socio-Psychological Prize and the AAAS Prize for Behavioral Science Research in 1959. That year, Schachter also won the first of his several General Electric Foundation Awards, which he continued to win each year through 1962.

=== Later career (Columbia University 1961–1992) ===
After 12 years at the University of Minnesota, Schachter joined the Columbia University (New York City, NY) faculty as professor of psychology in 1961, where he remained until the end of his career. His work in the 1960s was focused on how attribution processes influence people in various aspects of both social life and self-perception, with studies on topics such as birth order, criminal behavior, pain perception, and obesity. Thanks to such studies as these, he was named Robert Johnston Niven Professor of Social Psychology in 1966. Schachter continued to obtain honors in the following two years, becoming a fellow of the Guggenheim Foundation in 1967 and winning the American Psychological Association Distinguished Scientific Contributions Award in 1968.^{[9]}

During the 1970s, Schachter's research shifted focus yet again, this time to tobacco-smoking and nicotine. His research on this topic proved that nicotine was a highly addictive substance and produced withdrawal effects in those trying to quit a full fifteen years before the tobacco industry would publicly admit these things.

In 1983, Schachter's extensive and ground-breaking research studies earned him a spot in the National Academy of Sciences. And a year later, he was given the Distinguished Scientist Award from the Society of Experimental Social Psychology. But being a man of great curiosity, Schachter did not stop performing research after obtaining these honors. In the mid-1980s and early 1990s, his research again shifted focus, this time to topics such as the stock market and speech issues.

=== Retirement and death (1992–1997) ===
At the age of 70, Schachter decided it was time to end his 31-year career at Columbia University and retired in 1992 with an emeritus designation. Five years later, Schachter died on June 7, 1997, at his home in East Hampton, New York. He is survived by his wife Sophia (née Duckworth) and Elijah, their only son (b. 1969). In addition to these two family members, Schachter left behind him a legacy of highly distinguished, influential psychology students, such as Bibb Latané, Richard Nisbett, Lee Ross, Jerome Singer, Stewart Valins, Patricia Pliner, Judith Rodin, and Ladd Wheeler. His papers are archived at the Bentley Historical Library of the University of Michigan.

== Contributions to psychology ==
=== Major publications and findings ===
==== Deviation, rejection, and communication (1951) ====
Schachter conducted an experiment that tested the social pressures that a person may feel to conform to fit the cohesiveness, match the opinions of the group, and significance of other group members. Schachter recognized the importance of communication and rejection among a group and coordinated these variables along with the constructs of the experiment. Results from Schachter's experiments are key components to studying interpersonal communication and group dynamics.

==== Birth order, eminence, and higher education (1963) ====
Schachter was also interested in research involving the original ideas of Francis Galton on eminence and birth order. It was believed that those who are more eminent, inventive, productive, or genius are either first-born or the only child within the family. Schachter's research concluded that this data is only a reflection because all previous research involves a college population as the experimental sample. He indicates that college samples for many reasons are overly-populated with family first-borns.

==== Obesity and eating (1968) ====
Schachter conducted many experiments that tested the internal and external cues of hunger with obese individuals. One experiment described in this publication was in relation to stress. This experiment involved two independent variables; and fullness. To manipulate stress a painful or non-painful shock manipulation was conducted on obese individuals and non-obese individuals. Participants were informed of a secondary study that would be conducted of taste-testing crackers. The dependent variable of the experiment was the amount of crackers consumed. Schachter concluded based on his findings that there are physiological responses (internal cues) that tell you not to eat when stressed. In the study, non-obese people ate less when stressed. This was compared to obese individuals that tend to be less sensitive to these internal cues and more sensitive to external cues such as food advertisements and periods of time dedicated to eating.

==== Nicotine regulation in heavy and light smokers (1977) ====
Schachter conducted research on the regulation of nicotine intake among different types of smokers. He tested his hypothesis that smokers do indeed regulate their nicotine intake. Results showed that long-term heavy smokers did in fact regulate their nicotine intake by smoking more of low-nicotine cigarettes. Long-term light smokers did not regulate their nicotine intake consistently.

=== Theories ===
==== Theory on emotion ====
Schachter along with Jerome Singer came up with the two-factor theory of emotion. This theory posits that emotion is based on two factors, cognitive labels and physiological arousal. When a person feels an emotion, physiological arousal occurs, and the person searches the environment for clues as to how to label the physiological arousal. They also propose two conditions that can occur when a person is in a state of arousal: when there is an explanation and when the individual does not have an explanation for their arousal. Under the first condition, an individual will use that explanation, and all will be fine. In the second condition, the individual will label their arousal based on external and internal stimuli.

One important piece of this theory is the misattribution of arousal. If the brain is unsure why it feels an emotion it will use external stimuli as clues for labeling the emotion it is feeling. Dutton and Aron's study of attraction in fear-arousing situations indicates that the environment can lead to misattribution of physiological arousal. They placed an attractive interviewer on the opposite side of a fear-arousing suspension bridge and a non fear-arousing suspension bridge. After crossing the bridges the subjects were asked to fill out a survey and given a number to call if they had further questions. The results were that those who had crossed the fear-arousing bridge were more likely to call the interviewer to ask for a date than those who crossed the non fear-arousing bridge. The explanation of these results was that the subjects had misattributed their arousal from the bridge to their feelings toward the interviewer, making her seem more attractive.

==== Theory on obesity ====
Schachter proposed that obese individuals are hypersensitive to external stimuli, both food-related and non-food related. Schachter found that a number of factors lead to differences in responses between obese individuals and normal individuals. Obese individuals will eat more than normal individuals when food is easy to get but will eat less than normal individuals when food is harder to get. An increased amount of visible food correlates with a decrease in the number of sandwiches eaten by normal individuals but an increase in the number eaten by obese individuals. Taste also caused variations in amount consumed. While both groups consumed less of the bad-tasting food than they did the good-tasting food, the obese individuals had a higher difference; they ate more of the good tasting food and less of the bad tasting food than normal individuals.

== Publications ==
=== Books ===
- Schachter, S (1950) With L. Festinger and K. Back. Social Pressures in Informal Groups. New York: Harpers.
- Schachter, S (1956) With L. Festinger and H. Riecken. When Prophecy Fails. Minneapolis: University of Minnesota Press.
- Schachter, S (1959) The Psychology of Affiliation. Stanford: Stanford University Press.
- Schachter, S (1971). Emotion, Obesity and Crime. New York: Academic.
- Schachter, S & Rodin, J. (1974). Obese Humans and Rats. Hillsdale, NJ.: Erlbaum.

== Book chapters ==
- Schachter, S. (1964) The interaction of cognitive and physiological determinants of emotional state. In Advances in Experimental Social Psychology, ed. L. Berkowitz, pp. 49–79. New York: Academic Press.
- Schachter, S. & Latané, B. (1964). Crime, cognition and the autonomic nervous system. In Nebraska Symposium on Motivation, ed. D. Levine, pp. 221–73. Lincoln: University of Nebraska Press.
- Schachter, S. (1973). Nesbitt's Paradox. In Smoking Behavior: Motives and Incentives, ed. W.L. Dunn, pp. 147-156. Washington, D.C.: V.H. Winston & Sons. Inc. (copy available at UCSF Industry Document Library)
- Schachter, S. (1980). Nonpsychological explanations of behavior. In Retrospective on Social Psychology, ed. L. Festinger, pp. 131–57. New York: Oxford University Press.

=== Papers ===
- Schachter, S. (1951) Deviation, rejection and communication.J. Abnorm. Soc. Psychol. 46:190-207.
- Schachter, S. (1962) With J. Singer. Cognitive, social and physiological determinants of emotional state. Psychol. Rev. 69:379-99.
- Schachter, S. (1963) Birth order, eminence and higher education. Am. Sociol. Rev. 28:757-68.
- Schachter, S. (1968). Obesity and eating. Science 161:751-56.
- Schachter, S. (1971). Some extraordinary facts about obese humans and rats. Am. Psychol. 26:129-44.
- Schachter, S. (1977). Nicotine regulation in heavy and light smokers. J. Exp. Psychol. 106:5-12.
- Schachter, S. (1978). Pharmacological and psychological determinants of cigarette smoking. Ann. Intern. Med. 88:104-14.
- Schachter, S. (1982). Recidivism and self-cure of smoking and obesity. Am. Psychol. 37:436-44.
- Schachter, S. (1991) With N. J. S. Christenfeld, B. Ravina, and F. R. Bilous. Speech disfluency and the structure of knowledge. J. Pers. Soc. Psychol. 60:362-67.
