= John Dillingham Dodson =

American psychologist

- Born: 1879; Allen County, Kentucky
- Died: 1955 (aged 75–76); Warren County, Kentucky

John Dillingham Dodson (1879 in Allen County Ky – 1955 in Warren County Ky), was an American psychologist. In 1908, together with Robert Yerkes, Dodson proposed the Yerkes–Dodson Law relating motivation and habit. He obtained a master's degree from Harvard University and was the first PhD graduate of the psychology department of the University of Minnesota. His fate after the publication of his seminal paper with Yerkes became a mystery with inquiries first raised in 1921 and continuing through 2001. Research published in 2012 finds he spent much of his academic life teaching at the Bowling Green College of Commerce, which became part of Western Kentucky University.
