= James A. Russell =

American psychologist (born 1947)

- Born: March 7, 1947 (age 79); Santa Monica, California
- Education: UCLA (Ph.D.)
- Scientific career
- Fields: Emotion
- Workplaces: University of British Columbia (1975-2000); Boston College (2000-2025)
- Thesis: Approach-avoidance and the emotional impact of the physical environment (1974)
- Doctoral advisor: Albert Mehrabian

James A. Russell is an American psychologist whose work focuses on emotion. In 2009, Russell was ranked 35th in terms of citation impact in social psychology.

== Circumplex model of affects ==
In 1980, Russell published a model of emotion that has become widely accepted. It is a simple coordinate system based on two metrics, activation (arousal) and hedonic tone (valence). Arousal refers to the degree of physiological activation or emotional intensity, ranging from low levels associated with calmness to high levels of stimulation. Valence denotes the qualitative aspect of emotion, distinguishing between pleasant and unpleasant experiences.

Emotions associated with high arousal and unpleasant valence include tension, nervousness, stress, and upset. High-arousal emotions with pleasant valence include alertness, excitement, elation, and happiness. Low-arousal emotions with unpleasant valence include sadness, depression, lethargy, and fatigue, whereas low-arousal emotions with pleasant valence include contentment, serenity, relaxation, and calmness. Some emotions align closely with the extremes of these dimensions. Surprise corresponds to very high arousal, sadness to very low arousal, fear, anger, and disgust to strongly unpleasant valence, and happiness to strongly pleasant valence.

Research has identified associations between the dimensions of valence and arousal and a range of cognitive and behavioral processes, including ethical judgment (Gaudine & Thorne, 2001), problem solving (Spering et al., 2005), memory (Levine & Pizarro, 2004), and creativity (Zenasni & Lubart, 2008).

The model is also used in AI development.

== Selected publications ==
=== Books ===
- Barrett, L. F., & Russell, J. A., Eds. (2015). The psychological construction of emotion. New York: Guilford Press.
- Russell, J. A., Ed. (2003). Pleasure. Andover, Hampshire U.K.: Routledge: Taylor & Francis Group.

=== Articles ===
- Widen, S. C.; Russell, J. A. (2013). "Children's recognition of disgust in others". Psychological Bulletin. 139 (2): 271–299. doi:10.1037/a0031640. PMID 23458434.
- Posner, J.; Russell, J. A.; Peterson, B.S. (2005). "A circumplex model of affect: An integrative approach to affective neuroscience, cognitive development, and psychopathology". Development and Psychopathology. 17 (3): 715–734. doi:10.1017/s0954579405050340. PMC 2367156. PMID 16262989.
- Russell, J. A. (2003). "Core affect and the psychological construction of emotion". Psychological Review. 110 (1): 145–172. doi:10.1037/0033-295x.110.1.145. PMID 12529060. S2CID 2890641.
- Russell, J. A.; Carroll, J. M. (1999). "On the bipolarity of positive and negative affect". Psychological Bulletin. 125 (1): 3–30. doi:10.1037/0033-2909.125.1.3. PMID 9990843. S2CID 4821100.
- Russell, J. A. (1994). "Is there universal recognition of emotion from facial expression? A review of the cross-cultural studies". Psychological Bulletin. 115 (1): 102–141. doi:10.1037/0033-2909.115.1.102. PMID 8202574.
- Russell, J. A. (1991). "Culture and the categorization of emotion". Psychological Bulletin. 110 (3): 426–450. doi:10.1037/0033-2909.110.3.426. PMID 1758918. S2CID 4830394.
- Russell, J. A.; Fehr, B. (1987). "Relativity in the perception of emotion in facial expressions". Journal of Experimental Psychology: General. 116 (3): 223–237. doi:10.1037/0096-3445.116.3.223. S2CID 7225463.
- Fehr, B.; Russell, J.A. (1984). "Concept of emotion viewed from a prototype perspective". Journal of Experimental Psychology: General. 113 (3): 464–486. doi:10.1037/0096-3445.113.3.464.

== See also ==
- Facial expression
- Facial Action Coding System
- Affect display
- Emotions and culture
