= Low arousal approach =

Within the study of human behavior, the Low Arousal Approach was developed by Professor Andrew McDonnell in the 1990s, and is now an internationally recognized model of behavior support. A low arousal approach to managing behavior of concern or challenging behavior focuses on stress and well-being, as well as how care givers respond in moments of crisis. Arousal refers to physiological arousal (e.g. heart rate) in response to stress, as opposed to sexual arousal. A low arousal approach to supporting individuals with additional needs aims to avoid confrontational situations and instead walk the path of least resistance.

== Philosophy ==
With strong roots in humanism, low arousal approaches have a philosophy of non-confrontation and 'do no harm'. In situations which may be stressful, responses that reduce levels of physiological arousal and stress are adopted by carers and staff, especially when supporting distressed individuals, who are more likely to perceive situations as stressful or threatening. These approaches became popular in services for people with intellectual disabilities and autism in the UK in the mid-1990s. This humanistic and person-centered approach to crisis management was developed by the organisation Studio 3 Training Systems and Clinical Services in response to the use of restrictive practices to manage crises such as physical restraint, seclusion, and chemical restraint. The avoidance of sanctions and consequence-based punishment strategies is an implicit part of the approach.

== Strategies ==
A number of different strategies are employed in healthcare settings for the management of challenging behavior. A theoretical rationale for a collection of short-term non-aversive behavior management strategies described as low arousal approaches is to avoid the use of punishing consequences to behavior.

The approach acknowledges the potential role of cognitive behavioral frameworks in shaping staff behavior.

=== Components ===
There are four key components considered central to low arousal approaches identified by McDonnell (2010) in 'Managing Aggressive Behavior in Care Settings: Understanding and Applying Low Arousal Approaches'. Those include both cognitive and behavioral elements:

1. Decreasing staff demands and requests to reduce potential points of conflict around an individual
2. Avoiding potentially arousing triggers, such as direct eye contact, touch, and removal of spectators to the incident
3. Avoidance of non-verbal behaviors that may lead to conflict, such as aggressive postures and stances
4. Challenging staff beliefs about the short-term management of challenging behaviors

== Evidence ==
This approach is based on the link between autism and arousal, which also applies to a number of other conditions such as intellectual disabilities, dementia, and acquired brain injury. In theory, the approach is based on the link between stress and arousal, such that individuals who are highly stressed are more likely to engage in behaviors of concern, such as aggression and self-injurious behavior (SIB). As evidence has shown that individuals with autism and other additional support needs are easily aroused by stressful environments, low arousal approaches seek to reduce environmental stress before crisis situations arise.

Academic research into the effect of levels of arousal on instances of challenging behavior have proposed that sensory reactivity is associated with hyper-arousal, and that hypo-arousal can lead to catatonic-type behaviors. Low arousal approaches are hypothesized as a generalized strategy to managing behaviors of concern associated with over and under arousal.

Studies have been published that directly examine the application of these approaches. In a case study, there was a significant reduction in verbal and physical aggression following the application of low arousal approaches with an adult with an intellectual disability in a hospital setting.

=== Autism and arousal ===
Arousal is not a new construct and was originally proposed as an explanatory theory for autism spectrum disorders. Two implications of this theory are that children and adults with an autism spectrum disorder (ASD) would be more reactive to sensory stimuli than the standard population, and they may be slower to habituate to stimuli. There is some laboratory evidence of differences in physiological responses of individuals with ASD compared to non-autistic controls.

There have been studies comparing autistic children to non-autistic controls, one studying the baseline heart rates of each, and another comparing their baseline skin conductance responses.

=== Hyper- or hypo-arousal? ===
Hyper-arousal is not universally accepted by all researchers. A recent review of sensory difficulties in autism concluded that the experimental evidence or hyper-arousal was at best mixed. There are a number of problems with this view. First, ASD is a heterogeneous condition and the assumption that hyper-arousal should be a general explanatory theory of autism was too broad. Second, sensitivity to arousing stimuli may be intermittently presenting in individuals with ASD. Third, the stimuli employed in habituation paradigms cannot easily mimic real life non-laboratory-based events. Animal research on arousal has attempted to link deficiencies to conditions such as attention-deficit hyperactivity disorder, Alzheimer's disease, and autism.

Historically, hypo-arousal in people with an ASD has also been proposed as a factor to specific stimuli, although with limited laboratory evidence. Repetitive movements may serve a dearousing function. Unusual sensory experiences have been reported in autobiographical accounts of people with an ASD. Sensory over-activity has been explained as a possible response to hyper-arousal. An understanding of arousal and sensory experiences may have great explanatory significance for some forms of challenging behaviors.

=== Stress and arousal ===
Stress and anxiety has been proposed as a factor in challenging behaviors of people with ASD. There is a transactional model of stress and coping that emphasizes the interaction between an individual and his or her environment. In this model, stress occurs when the demands of stressors outweigh coping responses. There is a clear interaction between environmental and physiological events. Implicit in this model is the cognitive appraisal of threat. Some individuals with an ASD have difficulties in regulating their emotional responses and even communicating this to carers. To help account for challenging behaviors, such as aggression and self-injury, arousal may mediate stress. There is a strong association between arousal and sensory experiences of people with ASD.

== Arousal curve and information processing ==
The majority of individuals spend time in a state of arousal equilibrium. In the case of people with an ASD, two distinct arousal groupings have an effect on behavior. A group of individuals will be hyper-aroused and highly reactive to environmental sensory stimuli. At the opposite end of the distribution, a proportion of people are hypo-aroused. A number of people with ASD, who present with challenging behaviors, may experience either constant or intermittent states of hyper-arousal.

== See also ==
- Low arousal theory
