= Michael Apter =

British psychologist (1939-)

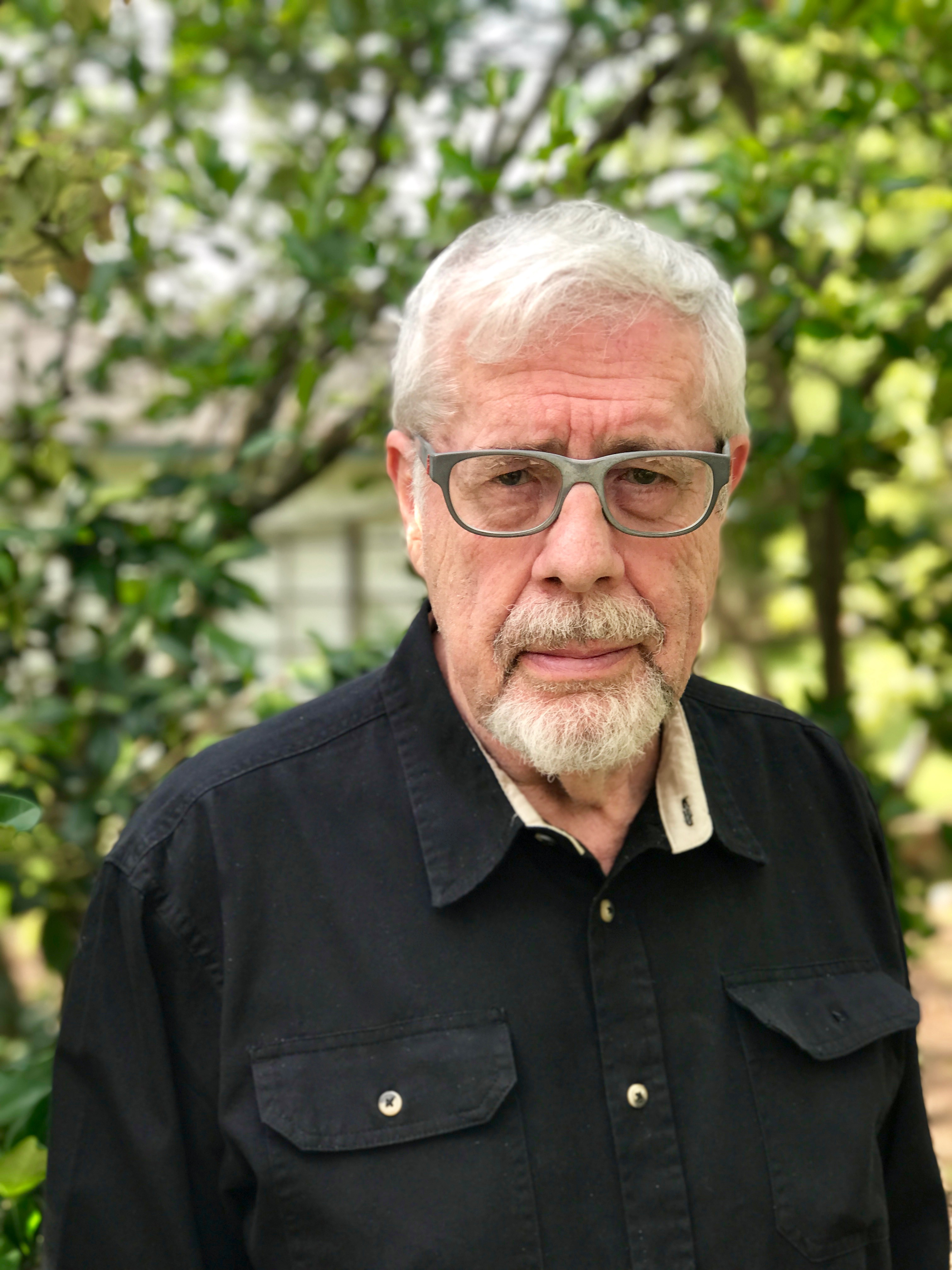
- Apter in 2017
- Born: Michael John Apter; 1939 (age 86–87); Stockton-on-Tees, County Durham, England
- Education: Clifton College; Bristol University
- Known for: Research in motivation, personality, reversal theory
- Scientific career
- Fields: Psychology, artificial intelligence
- Workplaces: Cardiff University, Purdue University, University Chicago, Yale University, University of Toulouse, Georgetown University, Northwestern University

Michael J. Apter (born 1939) is a British psychologist who was born in Stockton-on-Tees, County Durham and grew up in Bristol. He was educated at Clifton College (1965) and at Bristol University where he gained both his Bachelor of Science degree and his Doctorate in Psychology in 1965, having also spent a doctoral year at Princeton University. He taught for twenty years at Cardiff University in Wales and has since held invited positions at Purdue University, the University of Chicago, Yale University, University of Toulouse, and Georgetown University. He also taught at Northwestern University where he received a teaching award. He has held visiting positions at several additional universities and is a chartered psychologist and fellow of the British Psychological Society.

Apter's work has been mainly in motivation and phenomenology, particularly through the lens of reversal theory.

== Selected works ==
- Apter, Michael J. (1966) Cybernetics and Development. Oxford: Pergamon Press. ISBN 978-0-08-011431-6
- Apter, Michael J. (1970/2018) The Computer Simulation of Behaviour. London. Routledge. ISBN 978-1138496743
- Apter, Michael J. (1982) The Experience of Motivation: The Theory of Psychological Reversals, London Academic Press. ISBN 0-12058920-6
- Apter, Michael J. (1992) The Dangerous Edge: The Psychology of Excitement. New York. The Free Press. ISBN 0-02900765-8
- Apter. Michael J. (2001) (Ed) Motivational Styles in Everyday Life. A Guide to Reversal Theory. Washington D.C.: American Psychological Association. ISBN 1-55798-739-4
- Apter. Michael J. (2007) Reversal Theory: The Dynamics of Motivation, Emotion and Personality 2nd, Edition. Oxford: Oneworld. ISBN 978-1851684809
- Apter, Michael J. (2018) Zigzag: Reversal and Paradox in Human Personality. Leicestershire U.K.: Matador. ISBN 978-1788038867
