= Nicholas Christenfeld =

American psychologist

- Born
- Education: Harvard College (B.A.); Columbia University (M.A.,M.Phil., PhD),
- Known for: Theory of Deadly Initials, research on infant resemblance to fathers, dog-owner resemblance
- Scientific career
- Fields: Psychology
- Institutions: University of California, San Diego
- Thesis: Speech Disfluencies and the Effects of Mazes, Motives, and Metronomes

Nicholas Christenfeld is a former professor of Psychology at the University of California, San Diego until his dismissal in 2019. He first joined the department in 1991 and was a full professor from 2003 to 2019. Among other research, he has promulgated the Theory of Deadly Initials and the theory that infants resemble their fathers more closely than they do their mothers. More recently, he studied the tendency of people to choose purebred dogs which resembled them.

== Education ==
- 1991 Ph.D. Columbia University. Thesis: Speech Disfluencies and the Effects of Mazes, Motives, and Metronomes.
- 1989 M.Phil. Columbia University.
- 1988 M.A. Columbia University. Thesis: Predicting Stock Market Predictions.
- 1985 B.A. Harvard College, cum laude with Highest Honors in Psychology.

== Title IX Investigations and Dismissal ==
Christenfeld was dismissed from his tenured professorship and denied emeritus status after a year-long investigation found he had violated Title IX by accidentally emailing a female student pornography in 2018. He had previously been the subject of five separate complaints, including allegations of sexual misconduct on university property and undisclosed romantic relationships with students. However, the university determined none of the prior complaints warranted significant disciplinary action.
