= Jerome E. Singer =

American psychologist (1934–2010)

Jerome Everett Singer (1934–2010) was the founding chair of the Medical and Clinical Psychology Department at Uniformed Services University. He is best known for his contributions to the two-factor theory of emotion. He also served as one of the fourteen members on the National Research Council (NRC) committee on human performance in 1985. Singer played a role in the cognitive revival of modern psychology. His main area of expertise was the psychological and physiological effects of various types of stress.

== Early life and education ==
Jerome E. Singer was born in the Bronx in 1934. He graduated from the University of Michigan in 1956 and earned his PhD in 1960 from the University of Minnesota. He studied under Stanley Schachter who was a former student of Kurt Lewin. He became a fellow at the Academy of Behavioral Medicine Research and went on to become a professor at Pennsylvania State University and at the State University of New York's Stony Brook campus. Later in 1976 he moved to the Uniformed Services University where he founded and chaired the Medical and Clinical Psychology Department.

He died of a cerebral hemorrhage. His wife of 52 years, Linda Ascher Singer survived him. They had three children together, Judith, Matthew, and Daniel, and three grandchildren.

== Career ==
He was one of 14 members on the National Research Council (NRC) committee on human performance in 1985. With a small group of other intellectuals he studied a new version of medical psychology that was an integration of social psychology, psychopathology, and psychobiology. This field deals with physical and mental health. Singer focused primarily on stress and its effects on health.

Singer has been referred to as the "best second author" in psychology, writing with and for Stan Schachter, Dave Glass, Andy Baum, and Leon Festinger. He looked at many things including cognitive alteration of feeling states, organ transplants and the psychosocial processes involved, Type A behavior and possible animal models, stress, and the interaction between psychology and public health.

He is most known for the Schachter-Singer theory that he and Stanley Schachter developed in 1962. This was a new theory in emotion research that took into account cognitive factors, something that had not been considered until the resurgence of cognitive psychology a few years before. The two devised a model of emotional experience using cognitive terminology. The model showed stimulation leading to perception and interpretation. This would create general autonomic arousal and coupled with the context a particular emotion would be experienced by the individual. This experience would then feedback to be perceived and interpreted continuing the cycle. Donald Dutton and Arthur Aron conducted a study in 1974 that provided experimental support for the theory.

This research was not unanimously accepted by the academic world. Many criticized the theory for placing too much emphasis on a "general pattern of excitement" and for not explaining the process of emotion that Schachter and Singer claimed happened in the autonomic nervous system. Two major alternative theories were proposed. The Facial Feedback Theory focuses on facial muscle movements playing a role in interpretation. Lisa Feldman Barrett put for a theory of two dimensions of emotion, valence (positive or negative) and arousal (high or low). All emotions can be placed on this two-dimensional grid.

Some of his other research topics included Machiavellianism, effects of noise, human factors, cognitive alteration of feeling states, human organ transplantation and the psychosocial factors involved, an animal model of Type A behavior, stress, and public health.

== Selected publications ==
- Cognitive Alteration of Feeling States: A Historical Background. By Jerome E Singer is a journal article in Integration of Physiological and Behavioral Science. This article addresses the idea that a person responds and reacts to objective or experimenter-defined stimuli, as well as apperceptions and subjectively defined stimuli
- Cognitive Social and Physiological Determinants of Emotional State by Stanley Schachter and Jerome E Singer is a journal article that was published in September 1962 in the Psychological Review. This article addresses the idea that emotional states may be a mixture of physiological states and cognition. (http://psycnet.apa.org/journals/rev/69/5/379/)
- Urban Stress: Experiments on Noise and Social Stressors by David C. Glass and Jerome E Singer
- Teaching Psychology in the Medical Curriculum: Students' Perceptions of a Base Science Course in Medical Psychology was published in 1983 in the Teaching of Psychology journal, the article is written by David Krantz, Lynn Durel, Jerome Singer, Robert Gatchel
- Apartment Noise, Auditory Discrimination, and Reading Ability in Children was published in 1973 by the Journal of Experimental Social Psychology. This article was written by Sheldon Cohen, David C Glass, and Jerome E Singer
- Perceived Control of Aversive Stimulation and the Reduction of Stress Responses was published in 1973 by Journal of Personality. The authors of this article are: David C Glass, Jerome E Singer, H Skipton Leonard, David Krantz, Sheldon Cohen, Halleck Cummings
- Behavioral Consequences of Exposure to Uncontrollable and Unpredictable Noise by Bruce Reim, David C Glass and Jerome E Singer, was published by the Journal of Applied Social Psychology in 1971
- Psychic Cost of Adaptation to an Environmental Stressor by David C Glass, Jerome E Singer, Lucy N Friedman was published in 1969 by the Journal of Personality and Social Psychology
