= Sham rage =

Clinical condition produced in animal experiments

Sham rage is behavior such as biting, clawing, hissing, arching the back, and "violent alternating limb movements" produced in animal experiments by removing the cerebral cortex, which are claimed to occur in the absence of any sort of inner experience of rage. These behavioral changes are reversed with small lesions in the hypothalamus.

The term sham rage was in use by Walter Bradford Cannon and Sydney William Britton as early as 1925. Cannon and Britton did research on emotional expression resulting from action of subcortical areas. Cats had their neocortices removed but still displayed characteristics of extreme anger resulting from mild stimuli. The concept has been rejected by many affective neuroscientists on the grounds that nonhuman animals displaying rage behaviors do indeed experience rage. This is the view of Jaak Panksepp, for example, who was among the first to describe the neural generators of rage.

== Symptoms ==
The physiological symptoms of sham rage include a rise in blood sugar, pulse, respiratory rates, and blood pressure. These symptoms can occur spontaneously and may also be evoked by sensory stimulations. In some cases, animals suffer several convulsive attacks followed by withdrawal of sodium barbital. It has been concluded that the cerebral cortex may play a facilitating part in this type of convulsive process. These physiological effects happen alongside the rage-like symptoms of hissing, clawing, biting, etc.

== Causes ==
There are only a few known causes of sham rage in animals. Most of the experiments done on animals have been done on cats, dogs and rats. The actual symptoms of sham rage are normal anger and defense reactions in animals. It becomes sham rage only when this rage reaction is triggered by unthreatening stimuli. A study by Bard (1934) showed that the removal of the neocortex in cats and dogs produced sham rage. The behavior of each animal was observed before the surgery was performed, noting how calm and friendly the animal was with humans and other animals, as well as their reactions to being handled. After the surgery, Bard observed that the animals would have an extreme rage reaction to stimuli that had previously produced little to no response, like touching the tail. He concluded the reason for this might be that the removal of the neocortex causes a loss of inhibition of the areas involved in the rage reaction, causing those areas to become hyperactive.

A study by Reis and Gunne (1965) found that electrically stimulating the amygdala of cats caused sham rage, which resulted in a decrease in the presence of adrenaline and noradrenaline. They believed this was because the excited defense reaction known as sham rage caused such a huge increase in the release of the neurotransmitters that the brain could not resynthesize noradrenaline fast enough to keep up. Reis and Fuxe (1969) then did a study on cats that went into a sham rage after having a brainstem transection. The purpose was to determine the relationship between the decrease in norepinephrine in sham rage and the magnitude of sham rage behavior. They found that a more extreme sham rage was correlated with lower levels of norepinephrine. They also found that when they gave these cats protriptyline, which facilitates the actions of norepinephrine, their symptoms got worse, but when they gave them haloperidol, which inhibits the functions of norepinephrine, their symptoms were less severe. They concluded that this meant the release of norepinephrine was necessary for sham rage behavior.

== Prevalence in humans ==
In some cases, human sham rage appears to be caused by "uninhibited hypothalamic discharge". This is not surprising, as the role of the hypothalamus in generating the internal experience of rage has been mapped in rats, cats, and humans. Three known causes of hypothalamic discharge are depolarization of the hypothalamus via electrode stimulation, carbon monoxide poisoning and insulin hypoglycemia. While experiencing sham rage, the human body will show both internal and external signs of physical distress. Bouts of sham rage are never intentional in humans, but the body will show "changes in the internal organs and in the composition of the blood similar to those characteristic of human emotional behavior". Although a person will express emotion during moments of sham rage, it does not indicate that the individual is actually feeling that emotion. However, there is no reason to suspect that the individual is not actually feeling the emotion, and the concept of sham rage, i.e., the expression of rage behaviors during increased activation in the hypothalamus in the absence of the internal experience of rage, is likely a false concept, and an artifact of the politics of the period of science during which the concept was created. Stimuli encountered by a human during an outburst can cause physical reactions such as pupil dilation, exophthalmos, increased pulse rate, an increase in systolic pressure, and widening of the palpebral fissures.
