= Carl Lange (physician) =

Danish physician

Carl Georg Lange
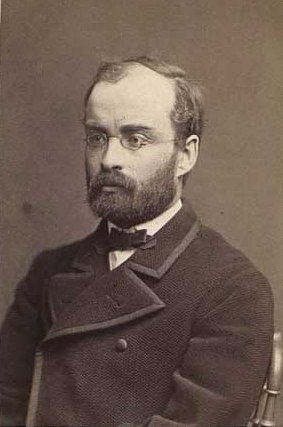
- Born: 4 December 1834; Vordingborg, Denmark
- Died: 29 April 1900 (aged 65); Copenhagen, Denmark
- Education: University of Copenhagen
- Known for: James–Lange theory of emotion
- Scientific career
- Fields: Neurology, Psychiatry
- Workplaces: University of Copenhagen

Carl Georg Lange (4 December 1834 – 29 May 1900) was a Danish physician who made contributions to the fields of neurology, psychiatry, and psychology.

Born to a wealthy family in Vordingborg, Denmark, Lange attended medical school at the University of Copenhagen and graduated in 1859 with a reputation for brilliance. After publishing on the neurological pathologies of aphasia, bulbar palsy, tabes dorsalis, and pathologies of the spinal cord, he achieved world fame with his 1885 work "On Emotions: A Psycho-Physiological Study". In it, he posited that all emotions are developed from, and can be reduced to, physiological reactions to stimuli. Seemingly independently, the American William James had published a similar work the year before, but unlike James, Lange specifically stated that vasomotor changes are emotions. The theory became known as the James–Lange theory of emotion.

In 1886, Lange published "On Periodical Depressions and their Pathogenesis," an exposé on the previously undescribed illness of periodic depressions without mania known today as major depressive disorder. He asserted that the disease was extremely common in his practice. Based on observations he made of his patients' urine, he hypothesized that the illness was related to an excess of uric acid in the blood and advocated for methods of reducing this substance, including the use of lithium. His recommendations were discarded by the psychiatric community, as were his nosological assertions of the uniqueness of the disease. Lithium was later found in 1949 to be an effective treatment for mood disorders, although the concept of a uric acid diathesis was fully discredited.

But a connection between uric acid and depression is not without possibility.

He died in Copenhagen in 1900 at the age of 65.
