= James–Lange theory =

Hypothesis on the origin and nature of emotions

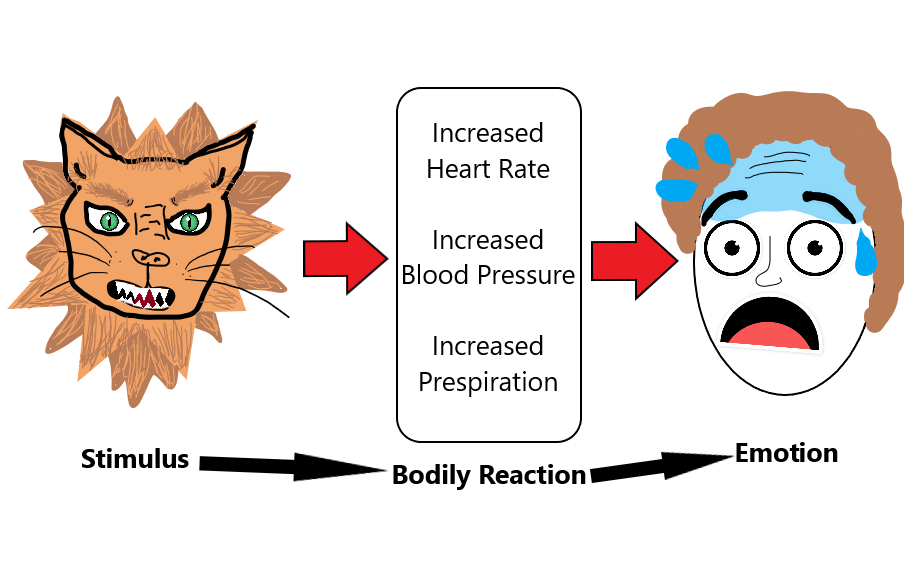
The James–Lange theory hypothesizes that stimuli trigger physiological response which is experienced as emotion

The James–Lange theory (1884) is a hypothesis on the origin and nature of emotions and is one of the earliest theories of emotion within modern psychology. It was developed by philosopher John Dewey and named for two 19th-century scholars, William James and Carl Lange (see modern criticism for more on the theory's origin). The basic premise of the theory is that physiological arousal instigates the experience of emotion. Previously people considered emotions as reactions to some significant events or their features, i.e. events come first, and then there is an emotional response. James-Lange theory proposed that the state of the body can induce emotions or emotional dispositions. In other words, this theory suggests that when we feel teary, it generates a disposition for sad emotions; when our heartbeat is out of normality, it makes us feel anxiety. Instead of feeling an emotion and subsequent physiological (bodily) response, the theory proposes that the physiological change is primary, and emotion is then experienced when the brain reacts to the information received via the body's nervous system. It proposes that each specific category of emotion is attached to a unique and different pattern of physiological arousal and emotional behaviour in reaction due to an exciting stimulus.

The theory has been criticized and modified over the course of time, as one of several competing theories of emotion. Modern theorists have built on its ideas by proposing that the experience of emotion is modulated by both physiological feedback and other information, rather than consisting solely of bodily changes, as James suggested. Psychologist Tim Dalgleish states that most modern affective neuroscientists would support such a viewpoint. In 2002, a research paper on the autonomic nervous system stated that the theory has been "hard to disprove". Despite important critical appraisals, the theory finds support even today: famed consciousness researcher Anil Seth is known for supporting a form of this theory.

== Theory ==
Emotions are often assumed to be judgments about a situation that causes feelings and physiological changes. In 1884, psychologist and philosopher William James proposed that physiological changes actually precede emotions, which are equivalent to our subjective experience of physiological changes, and are experienced as feelings. In his words, "our feeling of the same changes as they occur is the emotion." James argued:

If we fancy some strong emotion, and then try to abstract from our consciousness of it all the feelings of its characteristic bodily symptoms, we find we have nothing left behind, no "mind-stuff" out of which the emotion can be constituted, and that a cold and neutral state of intellectual perception is all that remains. … What kind of an emotion of fear would be left, if the feelings neither of quickened heart-beats nor of shallow breathing, neither of trembling lips nor of weakened limbs, neither of goose-flesh nor of visceral stirrings, were present, it is quite impossible to think. Can one fancy the state of rage and picture no ebullition of it in the chest, no flushing of the face, no dilatation of the nostrils, no clenching of the teeth, no impulse to vigorous action, but in their stead limp muscles, calm breathing, and a placid face? The present writer, for one, certainly cannot. The rage is as completely evaporated as the sensation of its so-called manifestations.

Physician Carl Lange developed similar ideas independently in 1885. Both theorists defined emotion as a feeling of physiological changes due to a stimulus, but the theorists focused on different aspects of emotion. Although James did talk about the physiology associated with an emotion, he was more focused on conscious emotion and the conscious experience of emotion. For example, a person who is crying reasons that he must be sad. Lange reinterpreted James's theory by operationalizing it. He made James's theory more testable and applicable to real life examples. However, both agreed that if physiological sensations could be removed, there would be no emotional experience. In other words, physiological arousal causes emotion.

According to James, when an individual is aware of their body's physiological arousal and emotional behavior their emotions are shown. He did not think the idea of common sense reactions were real but that each emotion triggered a specific physiological response. For instance, when someone hears breaking glass and they think someone is breaking in, if their heart starts pounding and they begin trembling, James would argue that they are experiencing this physiological reaction because they feel fear of a would-be burglar. Or, if the person heard glass breaking and thought it was their roommate being careless and clumsy, they would have a pounding heart and raised blood pressure due to their subject anger, according to James.

James argues that the sequence of events in experiencing emotion is:

Emotion stimulus → Physiological Response Pattern → Affective Experience.

The theory itself emphasizes how physiological arousal, with the exclusion of emotional behavior, is the determiner of emotional feelings. It also emphasizes that each emotional feeling has a distinct, unique pattern of physiological responses associated with it. It must meet two criteria which include (a) at least two emotions should be induced and (b) the presence of any emotion should be verified using other measures such as facial expressions or verbal reports. An example would be conducting an experiment to measure happiness and anger. One study is measuring happiness by giving rewards sporadically throughout the experiment while the other study is measuring anger by giving the participants a very difficult cross word puzzle to solve. Their physiological responses will be measured - which are blood pressure and electrodermal responses. Verbal and facial expressions will also be examined to determine either happiness or anger. According to James, the results will show that the physiological patterns, the blood pressure and electrodermal responses, will show different patterns for the different emotions.

Further researchers have also found that there are a few specific physiological differences among discrete emotions. For example, research has shown that heart rate is always higher in people experiencing anger and fear rather than those who are experiencing happiness or even sadness. It also shows that blood pressure is also higher in those experiencing anger than those experiencing fear, sadness and happiness. It also showed that electrodermal responses were higher in people experiencing fear rather than during sadness. But there were also times when the physiological patterns wouldn't differentiate which concludes that this theory is not 100% accurate and that there was not a unique pattern for each basic and distinct emotion. Which led them to blame the autonomic nervous system because the autonomic nervous system responds in a global fashion rather than showing those distinct reactions in an emotion-inducing situation and people also generally only notice changes in their autonomic nervous system rather than any specific physiological change. Which in the end concludes that our own perceptions of our body's physiological reactions doesn't give enough evidence and proof to determine the subject nature of an emotional experience.

The specific pathway involved in the experience of emotion was also described by James. He stated that an object has an effect on a sense organ, which relays the information it is receiving to the cortex. The brain then sends this information to the muscles and viscera, which causes them to respond. Finally, impulses from the muscles and viscera are sent back to the cortex, transforming the object from an "object-simply apprehended" to an "object-emotionally felt."

James explained that his theory went against common sense. For example, while most would think the order of emotional experience would be that a person sees a bear, becomes afraid, and runs away, James thought that first the person has a physiological response to the bear, such as trembling, and then becomes afraid and runs. According to James, the physiological response comes first, and it is perceived as an emotion and followed by a reaction.

== Reception ==
In Mortimer J. Adler's first attempt to earn a PhD in Experimental Psychology, he conducted a research study aligned with the postulates of James-Lange Theory of Emotions along with George Schoonhoven. Adler and Schoonhoven hypothesized that emotions could be grouped into two separate classes: pleasant and unpleasant. In order to demonstrate this hypothesis, they submitted their Psychology graduate students to some laboratory tensions that they could distinguish said emotions based on their physiological reactions.

On unpleasant emotions, they tested anger, shock and fear. Each of these emotions were tested by the following methods. In order to instill anger, Schoonhoven would kick the subject's sheen; shock, by firing a revolver far from the subject's vision field; fear, by involving the subject's head with a boa constrictor from the zoology lab of the Columbia University.

According to Adler, however, the pleasant emotions tests, hunger and sexual desire, were not well envisaged. On the hunger side, the researchers instructed their subjects not to eat for 24 straight hours, and would go to the lab. There, they would be submitted to smelling and seeing a bacon sandwich with a cup of coffee, but would not be permitted to eat it, so the downfall of that was that they would experience the sensations of anger afore-mentioned, such as dilated pupils, and so on. On the sexual desire side, the participants were enclosed with women with which they had already had sexual encounters before, girls which were instructed to engage in mild forms of fondling, accompanied by affectionate speech, which only caused the subject to feel embarrassment.

Unfortunately, the research could not attain to an end, nor would be published, because Schoonhover was diagnosed with cancer, and died thereafter.

== Criticism ==
=== Early criticism ===
Since the theory's inception, scientists have found evidence that not all aspects of the theory are relevant or true. The theory was challenged in the 1920s by psychologists such as Walter Cannon and Philip Bard, who developed an alternative theory of emotion known as Cannon–Bard theory, in which physiological changes arise independently from emotions. A third theory of emotion is Schachter and Singer's two factor theory of emotion. This theory states that cognitions are used to interpret the meaning of physiological reactions to outside events. This theory is different in that emotion is developed from not only cognition, but that combined with a physical reaction.

Cannon emphasized that the viscera had been separated from the central nervous system with no impact on emotional behavior in experiments on animals. He said this contradicted the James–Lange theory because James believed that the viscera were the center of emotion. Cannon examined research on dogs performed by Sherrington, who separated the spinal cord and vagus nerves from all connections in the rest of the body, and found that the expression of emotion did not change, suggesting that the viscera do not have an observable impact on certain emotional behavior in dogs.

Cannon also emphasized that visceral responses occur when experiencing many different emotions, and in the absence of emotion. For example, the same visceral responses such as increased heart rate, sweating, widening of the pupils, and the discharge of adrenaline can be associated with the experience of fear or anger. However, they are also connected to conditions such as fever, feeling cold, and having difficulty breathing. Therefore, the physical emotional responses that had so far been documented are too general to be linked to a specific emotion.

Cannon argued that visceral responses are slow and not sensitive enough to elicit emotional responses. J.N. Langley had shown that there was a period of two to four seconds between when the chorda tympani nerve was stimulated and when the salivary gland associated with this nerve responded. Thus, Cannon argued that there was too much of a delay between the stimulation of the viscera and the physiological response for it to precede the emotion.

Stimulating the viscera to produce a specific emotion was found to be ineffective by physician Gregorio Marañón. In one of his studies, participants had adrenalin injected into their veins, which produced physiological changes expected to be linked with an emotion. However, the emotion was never produced. The only noticeable changes in the participants were physical, such as activation of the sympathetic nerve impulse, which creates constriction of the blood vessels and dilation of the bronchioles. Cannon stated that this study disproved the idea that physiological responses are the sole reason for the experience of emotion.

The James–Lange theory was much discussed amongst the intelligentsia in America and Britain at the end of the nineteenth century. In ‘The Little White Bird’ (1902) J. M. Barrie discusses the psychological abilities of fairies with his young companion, David. He comments, "David tells me that fairies never say, ‘We feel happy’: what they say is, ‘We feel dancey’. " This, and related texts, suggest that J. M. Barrie was familiar with the James-Lange theory. Barrie, who wrote the Peter Pan stories, was a good friend of Henry James, William’s brother and had met William James.

=== Modern criticism ===
In 2017, Lisa Feldman Barrett reported that the James-Lange theory was created by neither William James nor Carl Lange. It was indeed named by the philosopher John Dewey, who misrepresented James' ideas on emotion. James never wrote that each category of emotion (fear, anger, etc.) has a distinct biological state. He wrote that each instance of emotion may have a distinct biological state. Dewey's assumed error "represents a 180-degree inversion of [James'] meaning, as if [James] were claiming the existence of emotion essences, when ironically he was arguing against them." Barrett notes that "Dewey's role in this [error] is forgotten."

Barrett also points out that when testing this theory with electrical stimulation, there is not a one-to-one response between a behavior and emotion category. In other words, "stimulation of the same site produces different mental states across instances, depending on the prior state of the individual and also the immediate context." She concludes that this means there is more going on when a person feels an emotion than just a physiological response: some kind of processing must happen between the physiological response and the perception of the emotion.

Further, Barrett says that the experience of emotion is subjective: there is no way to decipher whether a person is feeling sad, angry, or otherwise without relying on the person's perception of emotion. Also, humans do not always exhibit emotions using the same behaviors; humans may withdraw when angry, or fight out of fear. She says that emotion is more complex than a mere physical sensation. According to Barrett's theory of constructed emotion, a person must make meaning of the physical response based on context, prior experience, and social cues, before they know what emotion is attached to the situation. Barrett and James Gross have reviewed a variety of alternative models to the so-called James–Lange theory.

A study in 2009 found that patients who had lesions to the ventromedial prefrontal cortex had impaired emotional experiences, but unaffected autonomic responses while patients with lesions to the right somatosensory cortex had impaired autonomic responses without affected emotional experiences. This argued that autonomic responses were dissociated with emotional experiences.

The researchers argued that this dissociation between autonomic responses and emotional experiences clashed with James's assertion that physiological responses are required to experience emotions.

== See also ==
- Facial feedback hypothesis
- Somatic marker hypothesis
- Power posing
