= Arousal =

State of being awoken

Arousal is the physiological and psychological state of being awoken or of sense organs stimulated to a point of perception. It involves activation of the ascending reticular activating system (ARAS) in the brain, which mediates wakefulness, the autonomic nervous system, and the endocrine system, leading to increased heart rate and blood pressure and a condition of sensory alertness, desire, mobility, and reactivity.

Arousal is mediated by several neural systems. Wakefulness is regulated by the ARAS, which is composed of projections from five major neurotransmitter systems that originate in the brainstem and form connections extending throughout the cortex; activity within the ARAS is regulated by neurons that release the neurotransmitters norepinephrine, acetylcholine, dopamine, serotonin, and histamine.

Activation of these neurons produces an increase in cortical activity and subsequently alertness.

Arousal is important in regulating consciousness, attention, alertness, and information processing. It is crucial for motivating certain behaviours, such as mobility, the pursuit of nutrition, the fight-or-flight response, and sexual activity. It also holds significance within emotion, having been included in theories such as the James–Lange theory of emotion and being represented as one of the axes in most dimensional models for classifying emotions. According to Hans Eysenck, differences in baseline arousal level lead people to be extraverts or introverts.

The Yerkes–Dodson law states that an optimal level of arousal for performance exists, and too little or too much arousal can adversely affect task performance. One interpretation of the Yerkes–Dodson Law is the "Easterbrook cue-utilisation hypothesis". Easterbrook's hypothesis suggests that under high-stress conditions, individuals tend to focus on a narrower set of cues and may overlook relevant information, leading to a decrease in decision-making effectiveness.

== Neurophysiology ==
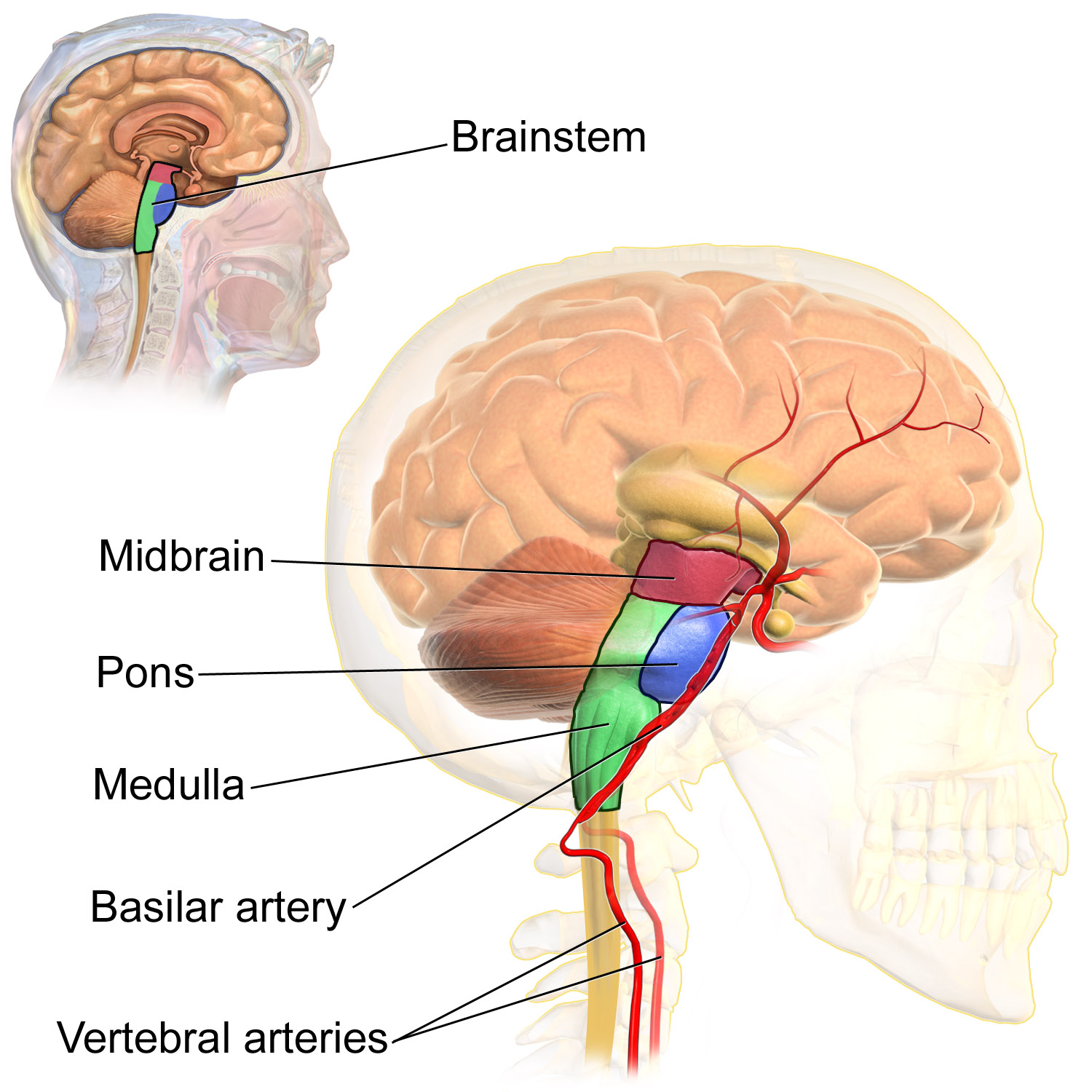
Structures of the brainstem, the origin of the arousal system, viewed along the sagittal plane

Wakefulness is regulated by the ascending reticular activating system, which is composed of five major neurotransmitter systems – the norepinephrine, acetylcholine, dopamine, serotonin and histamine, systems (each considered in the paragraphs below) – that originate in the brainstem and form connections which extend throughout the cerebral cortex. When stimulated, these systems produce cortical activity and alertness.

The noradrenergic system is a bundle of axons that originate in the locus coeruleus and ascends up into the neocortex, limbic system, and basal forebrain. Most of the neurons are projected to the posterior cortex which is important with sensory information, and alertness. The activation of the locus coeruleus and release of norepinephrine causes wakefulness and increases vigilance. The neurons that project into the basal forebrain impact cholinergic neurons that results in a flood of acetylcholine into the cerebral cortex.

The acetylcholinergic system has its neurons located in the pons and in the basal forebrain. Stimulation of these neurons result in cortical activity, shown from EEG records, and alertness. All of the other four neurotransmitters play a role in activating the acetylcholine neurons.

Another arousal system, the dopaminergic system, releases dopamine produced by the substantia nigra. The neurons arise in the ventral tegmental area in the midbrain, and projects to the nucleus accumbens, the striatum forebrain, limbic system, and prefrontal cortex. The limbic system is important for control of mood, and the nucleus accumbens signal excitement and arousal. The path terminating in the prefrontal cortex is important in regulating motor movements, especially reward oriented movements.

The serotonergic system has almost all of its serotonergic neurons originating in the raphe nuclei. This system projects to the limbic system and the prefrontal cortex. Stimulation of these axons and release of serotonin causes cortical arousal and impacts locomotion and mood.

The neurons of the histaminergic system are in the tuberomammillary nucleus of the hypothalamus. These neurons send pathways to the cerebral cortex, thalamus, and the basal forebrain, where they stimulate the release of acetylcholine into the cerebral cortex.

All of these five systems are linked and show similar redundancy. The pathways described are ascending pathways, but there also arousal pathways that descend. One example is the ventrolateral preoptic area, which release GABA reuptake inhibitors, which interrupt wakefulness and arousal. Neurotransmitters of the arousal system, such as acetylcholine and norepinephrine, work to inhibit the ventrolateral preoptic area.

== Importance ==
Mental state in terms of challenge level and skill level, according to Csikszentmihalyi's flow model. (Click on a fragment of the image to go to the appropriate article)

Arousal is important in regulating consciousness, attention, and information processing. It is crucial for motivating certain behaviors, such as mobility, the pursuit of nutrition, the fight-or-flight response, and sexual activity (see Masters and Johnson's human sexual response cycle, where it is known as the arousal phase). Arousal is also an essential element in many influential theories of emotion, such as the James–Lange theory of emotion or the Circumplex Model, among other models for describing emotions. According to Hans Eysenck, differences in baseline arousal level lead people to be either extraverts or introverts. Later research suggests that extroverts and introverts likely have different arousability. Their baseline arousal level is the same, but the response to stimulation is different.

The Yerkes–Dodson law states that there is a relationship between arousal and task performance, essentially arguing that there is an optimal level of arousal for performance, and too little or too much arousal can adversely affect task performance. One interpretation of the Yerkes–Dodson law is the Easterbrook cue-utilisation theory. It predicted that high levels of arousal will lead to attention narrowing, during which the range of cues from the stimulus and the environment decreases. According to this hypothesis, attention will be focused primarily on the arousing details (cues) of the stimulus, so that information central to the source of the emotional arousal will be encoded while peripheral details will not.

In positive psychology, arousal is described as a response to a difficult challenge for which the subject has moderate skills.

== Personality ==
=== Introversion and extraversion ===
Eysenck's theory of arousal describes the different natural frequency or arousal states of the brains of people who are introverted versus people who are extroverted. The theory states that the brains of extroverts are naturally less stimulated, so these types have a predisposition to seek out situations and partake in behaviors that will stimulate arousal. Whereas extroverts are naturally under-stimulated and therefore actively engage in arousing situations, introverts are naturally overstimulated and therefore avoid intense arousal. Campbell and Hawley (1982) studied the differences in introverts versus extroverts responses to particular work environments in the library. The study found that introverts were more likely to choose quiet areas with minimal to no noise or people. Extroverts were more likely to choose areas with much activity with more noise and people. Daoussiss and McKelvie's (1986) research showed that introverts performed worse on memory tasks when they were in the presence of music compared to silence. Extroverts were less affected by the presence of music. Similarly, Belojevic, Slepcevic and Jokovljevic (2001) found that introverts had more concentration problems and fatigue in their mental processing when work was coupled with external noise or distracting factors. The level of arousal surrounding the individuals greatly affected their ability to perform tasks and behaviors, with the introverts being more affected than the extroverts, because of each's naturally high and low levels of stimulation, respectively.

=== Emotional stability vs. introversion-extraversion ===
Neuroticism or emotional instability and extroversion are two factors of the Big Five Personality Index. These two dimensions of personality describe how a person deals with anxiety-provoking or emotional stimuli as well as how a person behaves and responds to relevant and irrelevant external stimuli in their environment. Neurotics experience tense arousal which is characterized by tension and nervousness. Extroverts experience high energetic arousal which is characterized by vigor and energy. Gray (1981) claimed that extroverts have a higher sensitivity to reward signals than to punishment in comparison to introverts. Reward signals aim to raise the energy levels. Therefore, extroverts typically have a higher energetic arousal because of their greater response to rewards.

=== Four personality types ===
Hippocrates theorized that there are four personality types: choleric, melancholic, sanguine, and phlegmatic. (See Galen.)

Put in terms of the five factor level of personality, choleric people are high in neuroticism and high in extraversion. The choleric react immediately, and the arousal is strong, lasting, and can easily create new excitement about similar situations, ideas, or impressions. Melancholic people are high in neuroticism and low in extraversion (or more introverted). The melancholic are slow to react and it takes time for an impression to be made upon them if any is made at all. However, when aroused by something, melancholics have a deeper and longer lasting reaction, especially when exposed to similar experiences. Sanguine people are low in neuroticism (or more emotionally stable) and high in extraversion. The sanguine are quickly aroused and excited, like the cholerics, but unlike the cholerics, their arousal is shallow, superficial, and shortly leaves them as quickly as it developed. Phlegmatic people are low in neuroticism and low in extraversion. The phlegmatic are slower to react and the arousal is fleeting.

The contrasts in the different temperaments come from individuals variations in a person's brain stem, limbic system, and thalamocortical arousal system. These changes are observed by electroencephalogram (EEG) recordings which monitor brain activity. Limbic system activation is typically linked to neuroticism, with high activation showing high neuroticism. Cortical arousal is associated with introversion–extraversion differences, with high arousal associated with introversion. Both the limbic system and the thalamocortical arousal system are influenced by the brainstem activation. Robinson's study (1982) concluded that melancholic types had the greatest natural frequencies, or a "predominance of excitation", meaning that melancholics (who are characterized by introversion) have a higher internal level of arousal. Sanguine people (or those with high extraversion and low neuroticism) had the lowest overall levels of internal arousal, or a "predominance of inhibition". Melancholics also had the highest overall thalamocortical excitation, whereas cholerics (those with high extraversion and high neuroticism) had the lowest intrinsic thalamocortical excitation.

The differences in the internal system levels is the evidence that Eysenck used to explain the differences between the introverted and the extroverted. Ivan Pavlov, the founder of classical conditioning, also partook in temperament studies with animals. Pavlov's findings with animals are consistent with Eysenck's conclusions. In his studies, melancholics produced an inhibitory response to all external stimuli, which holds true that melancholics shut out outside arousal, because they are deeply internally aroused. Pavlov found that cholerics responded to stimuli with aggression and excitement whereas melancholics became depressed and unresponsive. The high neuroticism which characterizes both melancholics and cholerics manifested itself differently in the two types because of the different levels of internal arousal they had.

== Emotion ==
=== Cannon–Bard theory ===
The Cannon–Bard theory is a theory of undifferentiated arousal, where the physical and emotional states occur at the same time in response to an event. This theory states that an emotionally provoking event results in both the physiological arousal and the emotion occurring concurrently. For example, if a person's dear family member dies, a potential physiological response would be tears falling down the person's face and their throat feeling dry; they are "sad". The Cannon–Bard theory states that the tears and the sadness both happen at the same time. The process goes: event (family member dies) → physiological arousal (tears) and emotion (sadness) simultaneously. The fact that people can experience different emotions when they have the same pattern of physiological arousal is one argument in favor of the Cannon-Bard theory. For example, a person may have a racing heart and rapid breathing both when they are angry or afraid. Even though not completely in accordance with the theory, it is taken as one piece of evidence in favor of the Cannon–Bard theory that physiological reactions sometimes happen more slowly than experiences of emotion. For instance, in the case of a person inside a forest, a sudden sound can create an immediate response of fear, while the physical symptoms of fear follow that feeling, and do not precede it.

=== James–Lange theory ===
The James–Lange theory describes how emotion is caused by the bodily changes which come from the perception of the emotionally arousing experience or environment. This theory states that events cause the autonomic nervous system to induce physiological arousal, characterized by muscular tension, heart rate increases, perspiration, dryness of mouth, tears, etc. According to James and Lange, the emotion comes as a result of the physiological arousal. The bodily feeling as a reaction to the situation actually is the emotion. For example, if someone just deeply insulted a person and their family, the person's fists might ball up and they might begin to perspire and become tense all around. The person feels that their fists are balled and that they are tense. The person then realizes that they are angry. The process here is: event (insult) → physiological arousal (balled fists, sweat, tension) → interpretation ("I have balled fists, and tension") → emotion (anger: "I am angry"). This type of theory emphasizes the physiological arousal as the key, in that the cognitive processes alone would not be sufficient evidence of an emotion.

=== Schachter–Singer two-factor theory ===
The Schachter–Singer two-factor theory or the cognitive labeling theory takes into account both the physiological arousal and the cognitive processes that respond to an emotion-provoking situation. Schachter and Singer's theory states that an emotional state is the product of the physiological arousal and the cognition regarding the state of arousal. Thus, cognition determines how the physical response is labeled; for example, as "anger", "joy", or "fear". In this theory, emotion is seen as a product of the interaction between the state of arousal and how one's thought processes appraise the current situation. The physiological arousal does not provide the label for the emotion; cognition does. For example, if a person is being pursued by a serial killer, the person will likely be sweating and their heart will be racing, which is their physiological state. The person's cognitive label will come from assessing their quickly beating heart and sweat as "fear". Then they will feel the emotion of "fear", but only after it has been established through cognition. The process is: the event (serial killer chasing the person) → physiological arousal (sweat, heart racing) → cognitive label (reasoning; "this is fear") → emotion (fear).

=== Classification of Emotion ===
Arousal is also an important element when classifying emotions. In particular, arousal is represented in many dimensional emotion classification models as one of the variables (axes), including the well known Circumplex model. Here, arousal is one of two dimensions, representing the "intensity" of an emotion, with the other dimension being valence. Examples for high arousal emotions include anger (low valence) or excitement (high valence), while sadness and boredom have relatively low arousal.

== Memory ==
Arousal is involved in the detection, retention, and retrieval of information in the memory process. Emotionally arousing information can lead to better memory encoding, therefore influencing better retention and retrieval of information. Arousal is related to selective attention during the encoding process by showing that people are more subject to encode arousing information than neutral information. The selectivity of encoding arousing stimuli produces better long-term memory results than the encoding of neutral stimuli. In other words, the retention and accumulation of information is strengthened when exposed to arousing events or information. Arousing information is also retrieved or remembered more vividly and accurately.

Although arousal improves memory under most circumstances, there are some considerations. Arousal at learning is associated more with long-term recall and retrieval of information than short-term recall of information. For example, one study found that people could remember arousing words better after one week of learning them than merely two minutes after learning them. Another study found that arousal affects the memory of people in different ways. Eysenck found an association between memory and the arousal of introverts versus extroverts. Higher levels of arousal increased the number of words retrieved by extroverts and decreased the number of words retrieved by introverts.

== Preference ==
A person's level of arousal when introduced to stimuli can be indicative of their preferences. One study found that familiar stimuli are often preferred to unfamiliar stimuli. The findings suggested that the exposure to unfamiliar stimuli was correlated to avoidance behaviors. The unfamiliar stimuli may lead to increased arousal and increased avoidance behaviors.

On the contrary, increased arousal can increase approach behaviors as well. People are said to make decisions based on their emotional states. They choose specific options that lead to more favorable emotional states. When a person is aroused, they may find a wider range of events appealing and view decisions as more salient, specifically influencing approach-avoidance conflict. The state of arousal might lead a person to view a decision more positively than they would have in a less aroused state.

The reversal theory accounts for the preference of either high or low arousal in different situations. Both forms of arousal can be pleasant or unpleasant, depending on a person's moods and goals at a specific time. Wundt's and Berlyne's hedonic curve differ from this theory. Both theorists explain a person's arousal potential in terms of their hedonic tone. These individual differences in arousal demonstrate Eysenck's theory that extroverts prefer increased stimulation and arousal, whereas introverts prefer lower stimulation and arousal.

== Associated problems ==
Altered experiences of arousal are associated with both anxiety and depression.

Depression can influence a person's level of arousal by interfering with the right hemisphere's functioning. Arousal in women has been shown to be slowed in the left visual field due to depression, indicating the influence of the right hemisphere.

Arousal and anxiety have a different relationship than arousal and depression. People with anxiety disorders tend to have abnormal and amplified perceptions of arousal. The distorted perceptions of arousal then create fear and distorted perceptions of the self. For example, a person may believe that he or she will get sick from being so nervous about taking an exam. The fear of the arousal of nervousness and how people will perceive this arousal will then contribute to levels of anxiety.

== Abnormally increased behavioral arousal ==
This is caused by withdrawal from alcohol or barbiturates, acute encephalitis, head trauma resulting in coma, partial seizures in epilepsy, metabolic disorders of electrolyte imbalance, intra-cranial space-occupying lesions, Alzheimer's disease, rabies, hemispheric lesions in stroke and multiple sclerosis.

Anatomically this is a disorder of the limbic system, hypothalamus, temporal lobes, amygdala and frontal lobes. It is not to be confused with mania.

== Effects of physiological arousal on cognition ==
The effects of physiological arousal on cognition cause individuals to be active, attentive, or excited. The term "physiological" refers to physiology and concerns the normal functioning of an organism. Physiological arousal refers to features of arousal reflected by physiological reactions, such as escalations in blood pressure and rate of respiration and lessened activity of the gastrointestinal system. These terms are what allow for the effects physiological arousal has on cognition itself.

Cognition is internal mental representations best characterized as thoughts and ideas- resulting from and involved in multiple mental processes and operations including perception, reasoning, memory, intuition, judgement and decision making. While cognition is not directly observable, it is still amenable to study using the scientific method. Cognition is also something that plays a fundamental role in determining behavior. Goes into explaining cognitive functions and how they are internal and inferred from behavior using measure like accuracy in performing a task like recalling a list of words of the time taken to find some word on a page of text. The study of cognitive functions derive from the information processing approach which argues that these functions involve operations occurring at various processing stages is typically based on a model of cognitive function of interest.

Physiological comes from physiology which is the study of the functioning of living organisms, animal or plant, and of the functioning of their constituent tissues or cells. This word was first used by the Greeks to describe a philosophical inquiry into the nature of things. The use of the term with specific reference to vital activities of healthy humans, which began in the 16th century, also applicable to many current aspects of physiology. Physiological responses to fight or flight: When the body is initially challenged by a stressor it responds with physiological activation (also known as arousal) of a defense system to deal with the immediate stressor. "If a stimulus is perceived as a threat, a more intense and prolonged discharge of the locus ceruleus which is the major nor adrenergic nucleus of the brain, giving rise to fibers innervating extensive areas throughout the neuraxis. Also referred as the Neuroaxis, is the axis in the central nervous system. activates the sympathetic division of the autonomic nervous system. (Thase & Howland 1995)" (psychologistworld.org, n.d.) The activation of the sympathetic nervous system leads to the release of norepinephrine from nerve endings acting on the heart, blood vessels, respiratory centers, and other sites. The ensuing physiological changes constitute a major part of the acute stress response. Which can often lead to as the fight or flight response. Anticipated behaviors are actions that are foreseen or predicted to happen in a specific situation due to different environmental factors. Furthermore, they are decided by one's past experiences and knowledge.

Anticipated behaviors examples

- Someone sitting in the same seat every day during class
- Someone reaching their hand out towards you would indicate they are wanting to shake hands
- While driving a car you would anticipate people braking therefore you would brake as well
- When a loud unexpected noise is created you are startled and flinch
- When a person sneezes you say "bless you"

A real-life example of cognition is used whenever decision making is involved; for example, a real-life scenario of a cognitive decision would be when a traffic light is changing from green to yellow. One would either make a cognitive decision to run through the yellow light in hopes you could clear the intersection before the light turned red. However, one could make a different cognitive decision to stop when they see the yellow light to not run the light before it turned red.

A real-life example of the effects of physiological arousal on cognition is when you're walking through the woods and you notice a rattlesnake in front of the walkway on the ground. You would feel alarmed and scared (physiological arousal). Your past experience and knowledge of poisonous snakes and dangerous predators provides the (cognition) of the situation. Based on your analysis of your position you label your arousal as fear. Fear is explained to be an emotion that one might expect with alarm, it is also known as something to be afraid of or the feelings of apprehensiveness. Fear works when one senses danger, the brain reacts instantly, sending signals that activate the nervous system. This causes physical responses, such as a faster heartbeat, rapid breathing, and an increase in blood pressure. Blood pumps to muscle groups to prepare the body for physical action like running or fighting. Skin sweats to keep the body cool. Some people might notice sensations in the stomach, head, chest, legs, or hands. These physical sensations of fear can be mild or strong. A study done by Joan Vickers and Mark Williams analyzed how a group of elite biathlon shooters handled an experimental task. The goal was to determine why there might be a failure to perform in high pressure situations. Difficulties come about when trying to test performance pressure, physiological workload, anxiety, and visual attention in a controlled setting. Which is why they decided to test these elite biathlon shooters, due to the easy ability to stimulate the controlled experiment. In the low pressure stimulation the subjects were only told that the purpose of the test was to simply provide feedback and the fixation on the target at different power output levels. In the high pressure situation the shorter were told that the national team coach was going to observe the shooters, and their shooting percentages would be used to make the national team selections. Both groups were told that prizes would be rewarded to the most accurate shooters. To test physiological arousal that was being used, Vickers and Williams measured each shooter's heart rate as well as the perceived exertion. Trying to determine if the failure to perform to whatever level of skill or ability the person has at the time, also known as choking; was indeed a factor in this test. Physiological arousal was measured and recorded through the athlete's heart rate and rate of perceived exertion. The findings showed that the biathletes developed the ability to decelerate their heart rate just before they shoot, most only shoot when HR is 80% or lower. Whereas the test was designed for shots to be taken with a heart rate 100% or above. The expectations were for the low-pressure and high-pressure groups to be more prone to choking compared to those who were able to maintain their heart rates. The findings showed exactly what was expected, the only exception was that the pressure applied did not necessarily have much of an effect. While it was clear that high pressure stimulations did appear far more anxious than those of low-pressure stimulations.

Problem solving is the cognitive process that someone uses to achieve a goal whenever a solution cannot be determined by others.

For example, you are with your buddies on a trip and get a flat tire. Everyone looks around nervously because nobody knows how to change a flat. But then you remember that you took an automotive class in college where you learned to change flat tires. You change the tire and solve the issue with your cognitive problem solving. Cognitively, the utilization of logical analysis and problem solving has been associated with higher levels of life satisfaction, better health, and lower depression in caregivers. A realistic appraisal and acceptance of the difficult situation is healthy and allows the caregiver to live his or her own life while accommodating the needs of the recipient. Less effective cognitive coping styles include avoidant-evasive, regressive, and an increased use of wishfulness and fantasizing by the caregiver, all of which have been related to higher levels of care burden (Hayley et al., 1987; Quayhagen & Quayhagen, 1988).

Cognitive appraisal is the stress perceived as imbalance between demands place on the individual and the individual and the individual's resources to cope. Lazarus argued that the experience of stress differs significantly between individuals depending on how they interpret an event and the outcome of a specific sequence of thinking patterns called appraisals.

It also refers to the personal interpretation of a situation that ultimately influences the extent to which the situation is perceived as stressful, process of assessing whether a situation or event threatens our well-being, whether there are sufficient personal resources available for coping with the demand of the situation of whether our strategy for dealing with the situation is effective.

The three parts that it can be divided into are primary appraisal, secondary appraisal, and reappraisal. Primary Appraisal is an assessment of how significant an event is for a person, including whether it is a threat or opportunity, also including that no heightened physiological arousal occurs it means no stress will either. Secondary Appraisal considers one's ability to cope or take advantage of the situation. Cognitive Appraisal is a personal interpretation of a situation and possible reactions to it.

Their secondary appraisal determines what the person will do, and involves their perception of their options and resources.

These appraisals can be accurate or inaccurate, and helping a person arrive at more apt appraisals is a goal of some modes of cognitive behavioral therapy, This is a psychosocial intervention that is the most widely used evidence based practice for improving mental health guided by empirical research cognitive behavioral therapy focuses on the development of personal coping strategies that target solving current problems and changing unhelpful patterns in cognition, behaviors, and emotional regulation. Also known as regulation of emotion; is the ability to respond to the ongoing demands of experience with the range of emotions in a manner that is socially tolerable and sufficiently flexible to permit spontaneous reactions as well as the ability to delay spontaneous reactions as needed. It can also be defined as Extrinsic and Intrinsic processes responsible for monitoring, evaluating, and modifying emotional reactions. Emotional self-regulation belongs to the broader set of emotion-regulation processes, which includes the regulations of one's own feelings and the regulations of other people's feelings.

== Misattribution of arousal ==
In psychology, misattribution of arousal is the process whereby people make a mistake in assuming what is causing them to feel aroused. For example, when actually experiencing physiological responses related to fear, people mislabel those responses as romantic arousal. The reason physiological symptoms may be attributed to incorrect stimuli is because many stimuli have similar physiological symptoms such as increased blood pressure or shortness of breath.

One of the initial studies looking into this phenomenon conducted by Schachter and Singer (1962) was based on the idea that the experience of arousal could be ambiguous and therefore misattributed to an incorrect stimulus. Operating under this assumption, the researchers developed the two factor theory of emotion. Misattribution of arousal, which is an influence on emotion processing, can be found in multiple situations, such as romantic situations and physiological responses from exercise.

An example of the possible effects of misattribution of arousal is perceiving a potential partner as more attractive because of a heightened state of physiological stress. A study done by White et al. (1981) investigated this phenomenon and found that those in an unrelated aroused state will rate an attractive confederate more highly than a rater without arousal. The researchers also found that aroused raters would dislike an unattractive confederate more than those without arousal.

Arousal can be defined as the psychological state of being hyper-alert. A high level of arousal can be brought on by high anxiety and stressful situations, such as zip-lining. A low level of arousal would be boredom, resulting from a low anxiety situation. Conducted by Donald G. Dutton and Arthur P. Aron (1974), they executed a study on high arousal levels, in relation to bridges. In the experiment, male participants were directed to either an unstable, and fear-inducing bridge, while others were directed to a secure bridge. A female interviewer would then give the male participants questionnaires, an image, and were told to write a story. She also gave the participants her phone number, on both bridges. The male participants on the unstable bridge were more likely to call the female researcher that night, along with romanticized stories relating to the image.

This study exemplifies that with a heightened state of arousal, on the unstable, fear-inducing bridge, the male participants will mistake the heightened feeling of anxiety for a romanticized feeling. Compared to the participants on the stable bridge, they were at a low arousal state, and did not have many romanticized feelings.

== See also ==
- Low arousal approach
- Low arousal theory
- Reversal theory
