= Reversal theory =

Theory of personality, motivation and emotion

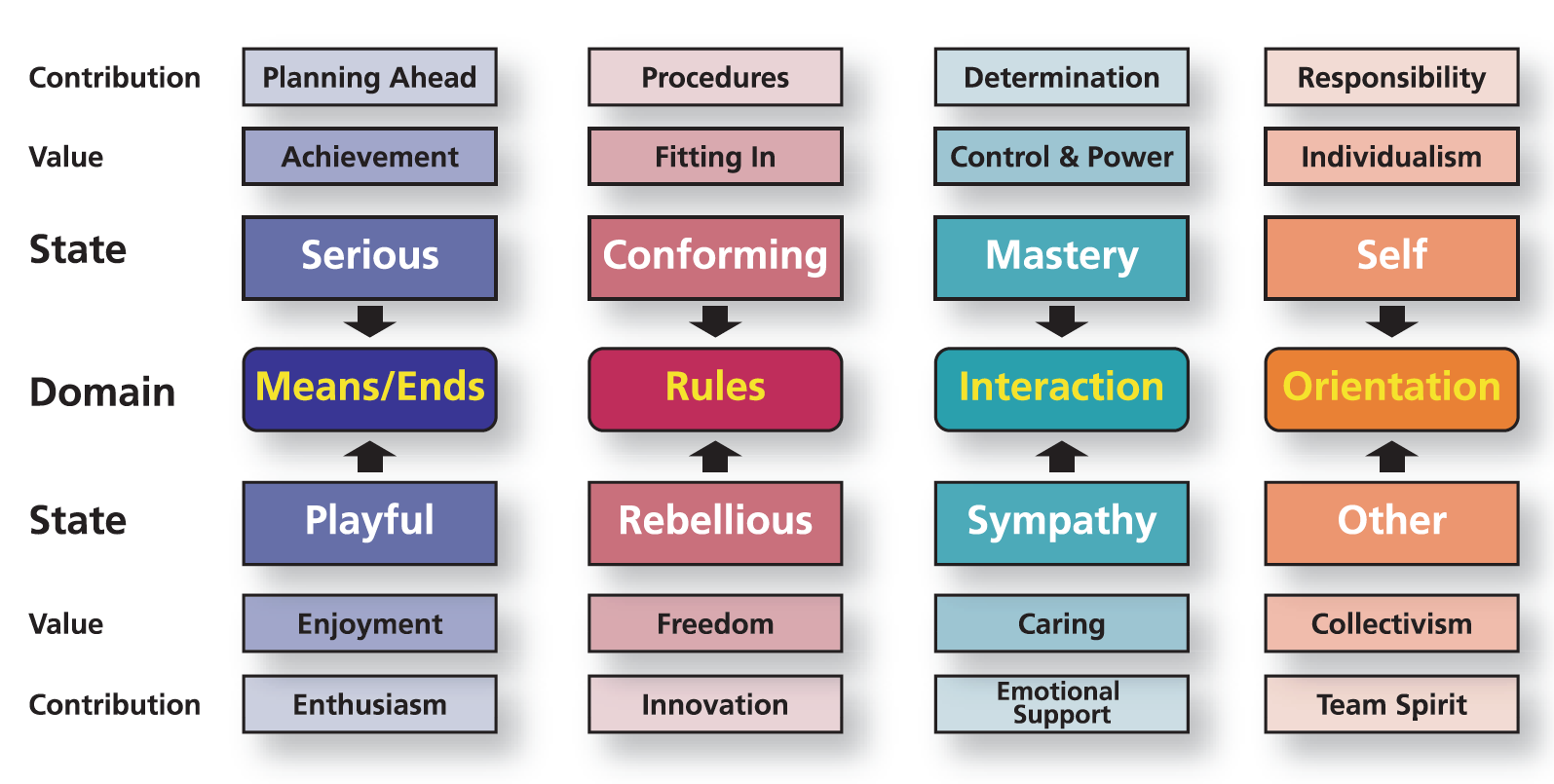
Reversal theory motivational states and values

Reversal theory is a phenomenological theory of personality, motivation, and emotion. It focuses on the dynamic qualities of human experiences to explain how a person goes from one psychological state to another, based on their motivation and the meaning they attach to a situation at a given time.

Unlike many theories of personality, reversal theory does not describe static traits, but rather a set of dynamic motivational states. As someone cycles through states, they prioritize, feel, and react in differing ways and look for different rewards. The theory emphasizes the changeability of human nature.

== Origins ==
Reversal theory was initially developed primarily by British psychologist Michael Apter and psychiatrist Ken Smith in the mid-1970s. The starting point was Smith's recognition of a personality dimension which he believed had been largely overlooked but was of critical importance in understanding certain kinds of pathology. He coined the terms telic and paratelic to describe the endpoints of this dimension, which can be defined to as the dimension from serious to playful. Apter developed the theory by suggesting that this dimension contains changing states, as opposed to enduring traits.

Apter argued that in daily life, people switch between the telic (serious) and paratelic (playful) states, thus experiencing the world in a binary way. He related this to the concept of bistability, in which an object has two stable configurations.

== Conceptual framework ==
=== States ===
The theory states that human experience is structurally organized into metamotivational domains, of which four have been identified. Each domain consists of a pair that represents two opposite forms of motivation – only one state in each pair can be active at a time. Humans reverse between the states in each pair depending on a number of factors, including our inherent tendency to adopt one style over the other.

==== Serious/playful ====
The two states in the means-ends domain are called serious (originally telic from the Anciet Greek word τέλος, meaning purpose) and playful (or paratelic) and refer to whether one is motivated by achievement or the enjoyment of the process. Though the states are often characterized as seriousness and playfulness, the true difference in is whether one is motivated by long-term goals or by what is happening in the moment.

==== Conforming/rebellious ====
The two states in the rules domain are called conforming and rebellious (or negativistic) and refer to whether one enjoys operating within rules and expectations; or whether one wishes to be free and push against these structures.

The first four motivational states are referred to as the somatic pairs. This is due to the significance of their interaction, e.g. serious-rebelliousness (defying authority) is different from playful rebelliousness (telling a joke in a business meeting.)

==== Mastery/sympathy ====
Mastery and sympathy refer to whether one is motivated by exerting power and control or by showing care and compassion.

==== Self/other ====
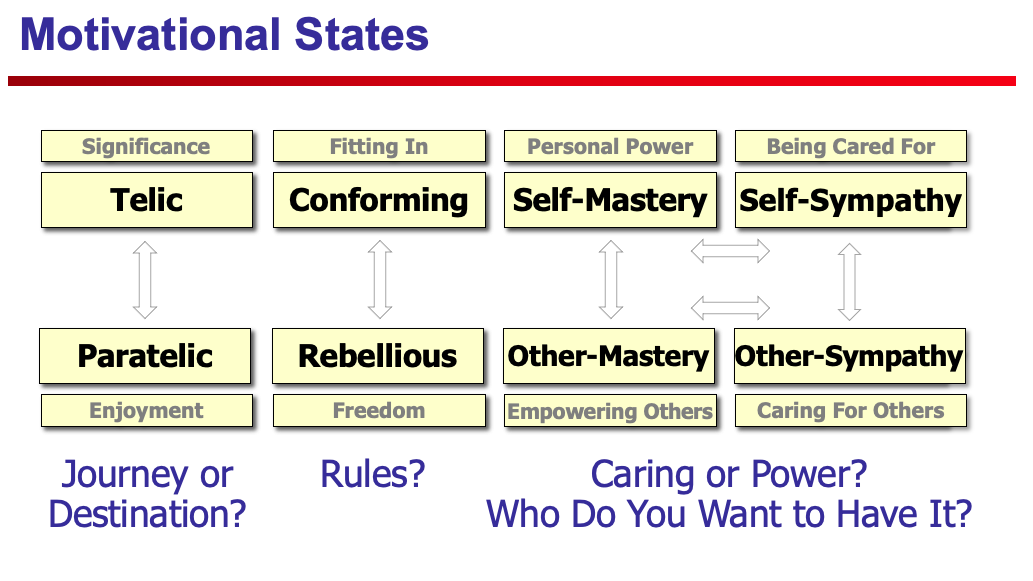

Self (or autic) and other (or alloic) refer to whether one is motivated by self-interests or by the interests of others.

The last four motivational states are referred to as the transactional pairs. This is due to the significance of their interaction, e.g. self-mastery (running a marathon) is noticeably different from others-mastery (controlling others).

=== Reversals ===
The primary emphasis of reversal theory lies in the concept of reversals. By triggering a reversal between states, we can change the meaning attributed to a situation. For example, a situation that seemed scary before can become exciting with a change of state and vice versa. Reversals can be triggered by changing the situation, reframing it, role-playing, or using specific symbols or props that invoke a specific state (e.g., a toy can help trigger the playful state; the image of a traffic sign may invoke the conforming state). Reversals can occur as a result of frustration, or with the passing of time.

=== Bistability ===
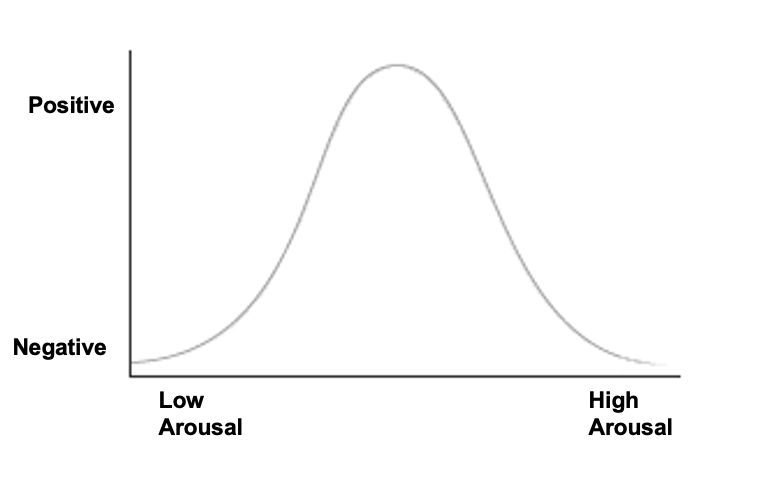
Homeostatic theory of arousal

Reversal theory challenges the application of homeostasis to human psychology; the idea that humans are always looking for a perfect medium state of arousal and anything too extreme in either direction is not to be desired.

Reversal theory proposes an alternate model of arousal, based on bistability. Proponents of the theory argue that arousal is experienced in each state in an opposite way and has its own unique range of emotions. In the serious (telic) state, represented by the solid curve, this range is from relaxation to anxiety, and in the playful (paratelic) state, represented by the dashed curve, from boredom to excitement.

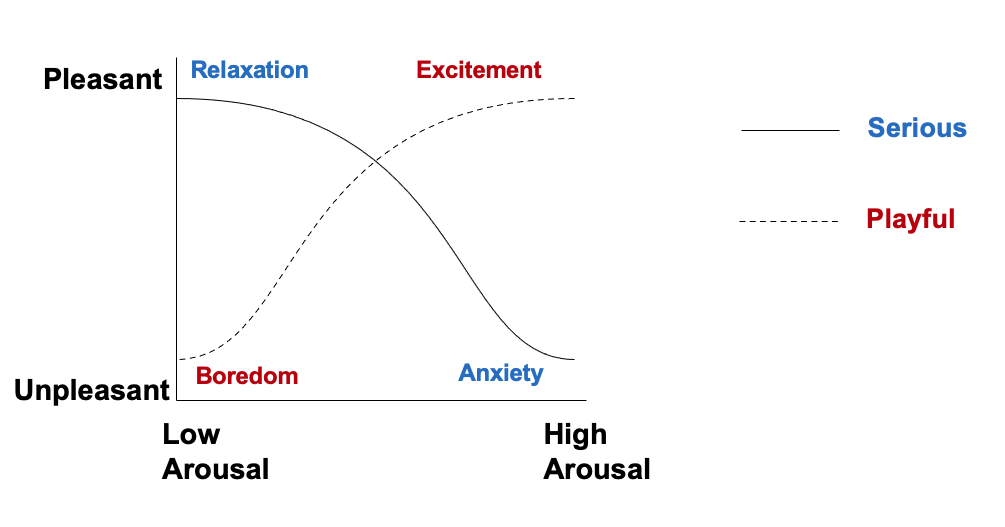
Reversal Theory Butterfly Curves

This framework offers an explanation for the fact that some activities involve very high arousal and intense pleasure as well as the possibility of sudden changes in experience. This reversal within arousal explains such phenomena as why people indulge in dangerous sports, why people commit recreational violence, the nature of sexual perversion and sexual dysfunction, the attraction of military combat, and the nature of post-traumatic stress disorder. For example, people gratuitously confront themselves with risk in dangerous sports like parachuting and rock-climbing, in order to achieve high (not moderate) arousal. This high arousal may be experienced as anxiety, but if the danger is overcome (and thereby a protective frame set up), then there will be a switch to the playful curve, and this will result in excitement as intense as the anxiety had been.

=== Dominance ===
Reversal theory introduced the term dominance to make the motivational styles a testable factor in psychometrics. Dominance is the tendency of a certain state to be more common than the other in a certain individual. An individual may be in a playful (paretelic) state, but if they are serious (telic) dominant, they will more easily reverse into serious states. This concept distinguishes the reversal theory from the traditional trait theory, by asserting that one's personality is not a permanent asset but a reversing tendency changing in accordance to the environment.

== Research and practical applications ==
The Reversal Theory Society has its own journal, the Journal of Motivation, Emotion, and Personality. Somes researchers study state dominance (the prevalence of certain states over others in an individual), while others study reversals (shifting states).

Topics analyzed through the reversal theory framework have included addiction, violence, stress, mental illness, consumer behavior, faith, education, marketing, and risk-taking.
