= Low arousal theory =

Psychological theory

The low arousal theory is a psychological theory explaining that people with attention deficit hyperactivity disorder (ADHD) and antisocial personality disorder seek self-stimulation by excessive activity in order to transcend their state of abnormally low arousal. This low arousal results in the inability or difficulty to sustain attention on any task of waning stimulation or novelty, as well as explaining compulsive hyperactive behavior.

A person with low arousal reacts less to stimuli than one without. This individual, according to Hare (1970) is "in a chronic state of 'stimulus-hunger'". To further explain, Mawson and Mawson (1977) claim that the individual needs more "sensory inputs" to feel normal.

== Causes ==
Researchers are unsure what causes low emotional arousal. Researchers have proposed three theories that could account for the low emotional arousal. The first theory stresses that emotional arousal is highly genetic. Secondly, some with low emotional arousal show underarousal of the hypothalamic–pituitary–adrenal axis (HPA axis). The HPA axis is responsible for the body's stress response. Because there is thought to be underarousal of the HPA axis, studies have shown that this causes reduced secretion of epinephrine and cortisol. These two hormones are responsible for the physiological response to a threat. Third, low emotion arousal often elicits hypoactivity of the amygdala. The amygdala in the brain is part of the limbic system, and is responsible for processing and regulating emotions. This could possibly explain as to why those with low arousal often lack empathy as well as emotional reactivity to other people.

== Antisocial personality disorder ==
Antisocial personality disorder (ASPD) is characterized by repeated deceitfulness, impulsivity, irritability, and aggressiveness since 15 years old. Persons diagnosed with this disorder often score low on fear conditioning. The lack of the empathy associated with ASPD is thought to be linked to the low arousal theory. A study conducted showed that people diagnosed with ASPD showed less physiological arousal to pictures of people crying than people who were not.

== Noise and performance ==
ADHD is related to a dysregulated dopamine system. In a study, the best performance was exhibited when stimuli caused a certain amount of psychological arousal. When using sound to help brain function, also known as stochastic resonance, it was found that significantly more noise is required to improve the performance of those with ADHD, since they have less dopamine (hypodopaminergia).

== See also ==
- Neophile – Personality type characterized by an affinity for novelty
- Novelty seeking – Personality trait
- Sensation seeking – Personality trait
- Yerkes–Dodson law – Relationship between stress and performance
