= Two-factor theory of emotion =

Psychological Theory

The two-factor theory of emotion posits when an emotion is felt, a physiological arousal occurs and the person uses the immediate environment to search for emotional cues to label the physiological arousal. According to the theory, emotions may be misinterpreted based on the body's physiological state.

The theory was put forth by researchers Stanley Schachter and Jerome E. Singer in a 1962 article.

== Empirical support ==
In 1962, Schachter and Singer performed a study that tested how people use clues in their environment to explain physiological changes. They had three hypotheses going into the experiment. First, that if a person experiences a state of arousal for which they have no immediate explanation, they will label this state and describe their feelings in terms of the cognitions available to them at the time. Second, that if a person experiences a state of arousal for which they have an appropriate explanation, then they will be unlikely to label their feelings in terms of the alternative cognitions available. Third, that if a person is put in a situation that in the past could have made them feel an emotion, they will react emotionally or experience emotions only if they are in a state of physiological arousal.

Participants were told they were being injected with a new drug called "Suproxin" to test their eyesight. The participants were actually injected either with epinephrine (which causes an increase in blood pressure, heart rate, and breathing) or a placebo. There were four conditions that participants were randomly placed in: epinephrine informed (where participants were told they would feel effects similar to epinephrine), epinephrine ignorant (where participants were not told about side effects), epinephrine misinformed (where participants were told wrong side effects), and a control group (where participants were injected with a placebo and not told about any side effects).

After the injection, a confederate, acting either as angry or euphoric, interacted with the students. The experimenters watched through a one way mirror and rated the participants' state on a three category scale. The participants were then given a questionnaire and their heart rate was checked. Participants in the epinephrine misinformed group experienced the highest euphoria, followed by the ignorant, placebo, and informed group. In contrast, participants in the ignorant group experienced the most anger, followed by the placebo and informed group. The results show that those participants who had no explanation of why their body felt as it did were more susceptible to the confederate, supporting the three hypotheses.

=== Misattribution of arousal ===
The misattribution of arousal study tested Schachter and Singer's two-factor theory of emotion. Psychologists Donald G. Dutton and Arthur P. Aron wanted to use a natural setting that would induce physiological arousal. In this experiment, they had male participants walk across two different styles of bridges. One bridge was a very scary (arousing) suspension bridge, which was very narrow and suspended above a deep ravine. The second bridge was much safer and more stable than the first.

At the end of each bridge an attractive female experimenter met the [male] participants. She gave the participants a questionnaire which included an ambiguous picture to describe and her number to call if they had any further questions. The idea of this study was to find which group of males were more likely to call the female experimenter and to measure the sexual content of the stories the men wrote after crossing one of the bridges. They found that the men who walked across the scary bridge were more likely to call the woman to follow up on the study, and that their stories had more sexual content. The two-factor theory would say that this is because they had transferred (misattributed) their arousal from fear or anxiety on the suspension bridge to higher levels of sexual feeling towards the female experimenter.

=== Schachter & Wheeler ===
In the Schachter & Wheeler (1962) study the subjects were injected with epinephrine, chlorpromazine, or a placebo (chlorpromazine is a neuroleptic, i.e., an antipsychotic). None of the subjects had any information about the injection. After receiving the injection, the subjects watched a short comical movie. While watching the movie, the subjects were monitored for signs of humor. After the movie was watched, the subjects rated how funny the movie was and if they enjoyed. The results concluded that the epinephrine subjects demonstrated the most signs of humor. The placebo subjects demonstrated fewer reactions of humor but more than the chlorpromazine subjects.

== Criticisms ==
Criticism of the theory has come from attempted replications of the Schachter and Singer (1962) study. Marshall and Zimbardo (1979, and Marshall 1976) tried to replicate the Schachter and Singer's euphoria conditions. Just as Schachter and Singer did, the subjects were injected with epinephrine or a placebo, except the administrator told the subjects that they will be experiencing non-arousal symptoms. Then the subjects were put into four different conditions: subjects injected epinephrine and were exposed to a neutral confederate, another in which they received the placebo and were told to expect arousal symptoms, and two conditions in which the dosage of epinephrine was determined by body weight rather than being fixed. The results found that euphoria confederate had little impact on the subjects. Also, that the euphoric confederate didn't produce anymore euphoria than the neutral confederate did. Concluding that the subjects who were injected with epinephrine were not more susceptible to emotional manipulations than the non-aroused placebo subjects.

Maslach (1979) designed a study to try to replicate and extend on the Schachter and Singer study. Instead of being injected with epinephrine, the administrators used hypnotic suggestions for the source of arousal. Either the subjects were hypnotized or were used as a control (same as the placebo effect in the Schachter and Singer study). Subjects that were hypnotized were given a suggestion to become aroused at the presentation of a cue and were instructed not to remember the source of this arousal. Right after the subjects had been hypnotized, a confederate began acting either in a euphoric or angry condition. Later on in the study the subjects were exposed to two more euphoric confederates. One confederate was to keep aware the source of the arousal, while the other confederates told the subjects to expect different arousal symptoms. The results found that all the subjects both on self-reports and on observation found that unexplained arousal causes negative conditions. Subjects still showed angry emotions regardless of the euphoric confederate. Maslach concluded that when there is a lack of explanation for an arousal it will cause a negative emotion, which will evoke either anger or fear. However, Maslach did mention a limitation that there might have been more negative emotion self-reported because there are more terms referring to negative emotions than to positive ones.

There are also criticisms of the two-factor theory that come from a theoretical standpoint. One of these criticisms is that the Schachter–Singer Theory centers primarily on the autonomic nervous system and provides no account of the emotional process within the central nervous system aside from signaling the role of cognitive factors. This is important considering the heavy implication of certain brain centers in mitigating emotional experience (e.g., fear and the amygdala).

It can also be noted that Gregorio Marañon also had early studies in the development of cognitive theories of emotion and should be recognized for making contributions to this concept.

== See also ==
- Cannon–Bard theory
- James–Lange theory
- Misattribution of arousal
