= Insufficient justification =

Social psychology phenomenon

Insufficient justification is an effect studied in the discipline of social psychology. It states that people are more likely to engage in a behavior that contradicts the beliefs they hold personally when offered a smaller reward compared to a larger reward. The larger reward minimizes the cognitive dissonance generated by acting in contradiction to one's beliefs because it feels easier to justify. The theory of insufficient justification formally states that when extrinsic motivation is low, people are motivated to reduce cognitive dissonance by generating an intrinsic motivation to explain their behavior, and similarly more likely to decline a desired activity when presented with a mild threat versus a more serious threat. Insufficient justification occurs when the threat or reward is actually sufficient to get the person to engage in or to avoid a behavior, but the threat or reward is insufficient to allow the person to conclude that the situation caused the behavior.

== The forbidden toy experiment ==
Elliot Aronson and J. Merrill Carlsmith hypothesized how people respond to punishment for doing something they enjoy. Humans comply with a very severe punishment, but it doesn't stop them from enjoying the activity and wanting to do it again. Thus, Aronson and Carlsmith thought that if they could convince the subjects that they did not like the activity that they previously enjoyed, they would be more likely to stop enjoying the activity. The experimenters would change their cognition in order to reduce dissonance. The researchers hypothesized that the opposite effect would occur for punishment. That is, if one doesn't give an actor an external reason for not doing an activity they enjoy, they will construct an internal reason for why they didn't really even like it in the first place.

In 1963, the researchers conducted their experiments with the preschool children. The experimenters threatened the children with either mild or severe punishment if they played with a desirable toy. Then, they asked the children how desirable the toy was after they were not allowed to play with it.

The researchers devised a method to have the children rank the toys from least desirable to most desirable. Then they told the children they would be back but, before they left, they told the children to not play with the most desirable toy. They threatened half the children with mild punishment and the other half with severe punishment. Afterward, the experimenters returned to the children and asked them to re-rank the toys. On average, the most favored toy decreased in favorability to the children threatened mildly and the most favored toy increased in favorability to the children threatened severely.

The researchers concluded that when people hold two psychologically inconsistent cognitions, dissonance arises.

== Other experiments ==
Insufficient justification and insufficient punishment are broad terms. They encompass ideas ranging from operant conditioning and behavior psychology to cognitive dissonance and intrinsic desires/motivation. Insufficient justification and insufficient punishment can be described as simple extensions of how and why humans behave the ways that they do in response to a range of stimuli. Researchers and scientists have studied this idea further through empirical studies.

Researchers Aronson and Carlsmith (1963) conducted a study using 22 preschool children, 11 females and 11 males ranging from ages 3.6 to 4.8 years, and their desires to play with toys in the face of mild and severe verbal threats of punishment. Experimenters told the children that if they played with specific toys that they would either not like the children to play with certain toys (mild threat) or that they would be very angry (severe threat). From this study, it was discovered that mild threats of punishment for playing with a desired toy would lead to a devaluation of that toy while severe threats would not. Therefore, the subject's relative ranking on the toy's attractiveness did not decrease with a severe threat but did decrease with a mild threat. The results indicated that when punishing children, one should use mild threats instead of severe threats because these methods will only inflict external pressure which, in turn, undermines the value of intrinsic motivation to behave in the desired way.

Similarly, in a study conducted by Abelson, Lepper, and Zanna (1973), it was found that kindergarten children reacted the same way. More specifically, 52 elementary school children, 23 males and 29 females with a mean age of six years, were tested using similar methodology as Aronson and Carlsmith (1963). When toys such as trains, slinkies, and robots were placed on a table in front of the children, they were asked which of the toys they preferred depending on which threats they received. Also, sticker reminders were placed on the "prohibited" toys. The conclusions indicated that the severe threats produced significantly less derogation for the toys than the mild threats did.

This concept of insufficient justification applies to adults as well. In another study, research was done within the workplace environment in terms of jobs and the subsequent rewards given to them to motivate workers. According to Pfeffer and Lawler (1980), the effects of extrinsic rewards and behavioral commitment on attitude towards specific tasks in an organization were demonstrated. Using a sample of 4,058 college and university faculty members, it was discovered that when individuals were committed to tasks, they develop more favorable attitudes toward that task with lower extrinsic rewards rather than higher extrinsic rewards.

The concept also applies in criminal justice and social psychology. Meares, Kahan, and Katyal (2004) discussed what it means for authority to dictate the proper behavior. They stated, according to the "group value" model, "the use of procedures regarded as fair by all parties facilitates the maintenance of positive relationships among group members, preserving the fabric of society, even in the face of the conflict of interest that exists in any group" (p. 1194). Although this specific example relates to the group, this concept translates into behaviors in general. When criminals understand that authorities are simply enforcing the law because they are instructed to do so, they believe it is fair and they therefore comply. Criminals who are given minimal punishment tend to view it as fair and therefore are more likely to find value intrinsically.

== Applications ==
Real world applications of this theory can be observed amongst children and adults. With children and their motivation to comply with rules, the concept of insufficient justification should serve as a resource for parents, teachers, and those who are in positions of authority. Presented with strong external rewards, strong external punishment, or strong external threats, children are less likely internally motivated to perform with the desired behaviors.

This principle can also be applied in the professional workplace. Employees are less likely to work hard and often less likely to enjoy their work if high external rewards are offered. This being that employees are less obligated to internally justify their motives for working hard, because the external payoff is so great. More specifically, this theory can be applied to pay plans, benefit options, and promotions.

Another real-world application of the insufficient punishment theory involves a study done on honor code policies at military versus regular universities. The study was called Dissonance and the Honor System: Extending the Severity of Threat Phenomenon. The study discussed the consideration of ethical responsibility and academic dishonesty in collegiate settings as something of great concern. Recent estimates suggest that up to 70% of college students cheat at some point prior to graduation. When put under the honor system, students are expected to uphold their personal sense of moral responsibilities. In context of this study, students that are used to being threatened with severe punishment for academic dishonesty are more likely to be dishonest when the immediate threat of punishment is not present; whereas students that do not face the pressure of punishment act consistently with and without the threat of immediate punishment.

== Controversies ==
An experiment was done in Rio de Janeiro, Brazil with elementary students to test the dissonance theory Aronson and Carlsmith proposed. They tested severe threat with high and low detection possibilities as well as mild threat with high and low detection. The results showed that there was not much difference between severe and mild threats with the children when playing with the forbidden toy. The table below shows the percentage of the children who complied with each request to not play with the favorite toy. It shows that both level of threats resulted in similar amount of compliance.

Probability of detection	Severe threat	Mild threat
High	90%	90%
Low	80%	45%

These results provided some new hypotheses. It was previously shown that economic status mattered because children in lower economic status show more devaluation for the forbidden toy under severe threat. The children in this experiment were from lower middle class in Brazil. Another major difference could be cultural. Different groups have different dissonances because of the different culture. The experiment in Rio de Janeiro showed that insufficient punishment may have cultural boundaries and exceptions. The experiment also suggested that forbidden toy experiment may only apply to children belonging to higher socioeconomic status in America.
