= The Social Animal (Aronson book) =

1972 book by psychologist Elliot Aronson

- 11th edition cover
- Author: Elliot Aronson
- Language: English
- Genre: Non-fiction
- Publication date: 1972
- Publication place: United States

The Social Animal is an APA-medal winning book about social psychology by Elliot Aronson. Originally published in 1972, The Social Animal is currently in its twelfth edition. In a style written for the general audience, the book covers what modern psychology knows about the reasons for some of the most important aspects of human behavior.

== Contents ==
Aronson begins the book by referencing a number of scenarios, real and constructed, such as the Stanford prison experiments, reactions to the Kent State shootings, and a four-year-old boy given a drum set, which illustrate a variety of human behaviors seen in real life. The rest of the book is spent primarily on explaining how human minds operate and interact with one another, using these situations as examples. Topics covered include aggression, cognitive dissonance, and the causes of prejudice.

In explaining the reasons why people behave in unusual ways, Aronson articulates what he calls his "First Law": "People who do crazy things are not necessarily crazy."

== Style and use of experimental method ==
As a scientist, Aronson leans on the importance of case work and experimental study. Thus, The Social Animal's explanations of human behavior are largely validated with citations of studies done by researchers of social psychology. Throughout the book, Aronson relies on the use of controlled experiments to validate empirical observation.
