= Reverse jigsaw =

Reverse Jigsaw is a cooperative learning technique used in classroom settings. Students are broken up into groups and given a task or topic to discuss, which is afterwards presented to the class by a chosen member of each group. It differs from the original Jigsaw method in that it focuses more on interpretations and perceptions of the material, rather than strict comprehension.

== Development ==
It was created by Timothy Hedeen as a cooperative learning technique and follows the same principle as the original Jigsaw method. Both methods use the small group structure to facilitate group discussion through which the learning takes place. The reverse jigsaw method resembles the original jigsaw method in some way but has its own objectives to be fulfilled. While the jigsaw method focuses on the student's comprehension of the instructor's material, the reverse jigsaw method focuses on the participant's interpretations, perceptions, and judgements through active discussion.

This method was created mainly to cater the higher level students. to save time it is best to give an explanation before the discussion of the topics takes place. It differs from the original Jigsaw during the teaching portion of the activity. In the Reverse Jigsaw technique, students in the expert groups teach the whole class rather than return to their home groups to teach the content.

== Process ==
The process of the reverse Jigsaw method can be explained in 3 steps:

1. Students gather in mixed groups where they are each given a case study with a number of questions or one complex question to discuss. Each group member is given a unique topic, so a discussion is initiated within it, and the main points and outcomes are noted.
2. The groups gather, compare the points and outcomes of their topics, and prepare a report compiling all the common and divergent themes. A reporter is appointed to present a summary before the class.
3. The class gathers as a whole and each group's reporter presents to the whole class; afterwards, the instructor debriefs the whole exercise with review or evaluation of the process.

== Application ==
This technique could be mainly used in two fashions: Case study review and Topical Enquiry. The complex questions that are imposed on the students can be in the format: "Why do X?"; "How to do X?"; "Why not do X?", or "In what situations would X not be advised?"; and "Give an example of X." These questions provide useful starting point and bring out the key elements of an effective discussion.

== Requirements and limitations ==
- This method can be only applied to undergraduates, graduates and other professional training groups.
- It is best preferred for students to form groups where they can face each other while discussing.
- In case the classroom has immovable furniture, the instructor can opt to send the groups out for discussion and can give a time limit to assemble back in the classroom for the next part of the exercise.
- During the discussions, the Instructor should float around the different groups to see if they are on the right track of discussion.
- The Minimum and maximum limit in a group depend on the number of topics for discussion. It is recommended that if there are three topics to be discussed the minimum students required are nine and if there are four then at least twelve students, and if five topics then at least fifteen students are required.
- Regular time checks have to be monitored as different groups may accomplish the task at different time.
