= Pratfall effect =

Social psychology effect about mistakes and likability

In social psychology, the pratfall effect is the tendency for a person's likability to change after making a mistake depending on perceived competence: highly competent individuals tend to become more likable, while average individuals may become less likable for the same error.

Originally described in 1966 by Elliot Aronson, numerous studies have since been conducted to isolate the effects of gender, self-esteem, and blunder severity on change in appeal and likability. Occasionally referred to as the blemishing effect when used as a form of marketing, generalizations of the pratfall effect are often used to explain the counterintuitive benefits drawn from making mistakes.

== Research ==
The pratfall effect was first described in detail by Aronson, in his 1966 research of a simple blunder's effects on perceived attraction. The experimental subjects consisted of male students from the University of Minnesota. Participants listened to tape recordings of actors pretending to be contestants on College Bowl, staged interviews with difficult questions given to an actor, who plays the role of either an unrealistically knowledgeable individual who almost always answers correctly (92%) or a mediocre one who answers only a few questions correctly (30%). After the questioning, the strong-performing actor admits to a stellar high school career marked with academic and nonacademic successes, while the unremarkable actor describes an ordinary high school career, earning average grades with weak involvement in extracurriculars. At the end of the interview, some tapes recorded the actor spilling a cup of coffee and apologizing for doing so, while others omitted this portion to serve as a control. Aronson's research found that a knowledgeable blunderer was rated to be more attractive, while the more average ones suffered decreases in their perceived attractiveness. Later research inspired by Aronson experimentally defined appeal as a combination of liking and respect and replicated similar results.

A research study showed that making a clumsy mistake increases the appeal of an exceptional individual whereas making the same mistake seems to make an average person less attractive. Additionally, these findings were anticipated based on the hypothesis that although a mistake helps to humanize someone and boost their appeal, a superior person may be perceived as extraordinary and aloof.

=== Sex ===
In a 1972 study by Kay Deaux, male participants were swayed more strongly by the pratfall effect than women.

=== Severity of pratfall ===
Research by Mettee and Wilkins reveals that the severity of pratfall plays a major role in determining attractiveness after a pratfall is committed. Experimentally, each condition was conveyed by changing the response of the interviewer and blunderer:

- Control condition: No blunder.
- Minor pratfall condition: The sound of a cup spilling is heard and the actor reacts with anguish.
- Major pratfall condition: Cup is spilt, and the interviewer reacts with hostility toward the actor, who apologizes profusely.

An able individual who commits a minor pratfall (2) will have an insignificant decrease in average liking and a small decrease in average respect, while the able individual who commits a major pratfall (3) will receive a significant increase in liking and an insignificant decrease in respect. A less able individual who commits any pratfall (2,3) will have a decrease in liking, which increases with the severity of the blunder. Respect only decreases in the less competent individual after a minor mistake is committed.

=== Self-esteem ===
Research conducted on self-image suggests that self-esteem influences whether positive aspects of the pratfall effect and self-comparisons will occur. An individual with high self-esteem will prefer the non-pratfalling highly able individual to the pratfalling individual of equal ability. This is well explained by social comparison theory which investigates the tendency to compare oneself to others with similar capabilities. When an individual of similar competency to a rater commits a pratfall, the relatability between the observer and blunderer can cause mental discomfort which then results in lower likability ratings. Since observers seek to build accurate self-evaluations, the commonality shared between the blunderer and the observer could threaten the observer's self-concept, especially in self-evaluations of abilities. A rater with a high level of self-esteem would therefore feel threatened by a blundering competent individual, therefore preferring the non-blundering able individual since that individual poses no threat to the observer's self-esteem. For the same reason, an average blunderer would pose more of a threat to an average individual, resulting in similar losses in likability. Individuals with low self-esteem tend to prefer highly able individuals. Although no research has been conducted on this topic, one such explanation suggests that a person with low self-esteem would expect to be "outshone", and desires to find relatability between themselves and the perceived competent individuals.

=== Attitude ===
Kiesler and Goldberg proposed that similarity in attitude between observers and blunderers can determine the extent at which changes in attractiveness occur. Greater similarities in attitudes resulted in more derogation, even to the point where the blunderer is subject to derogation regardless of perceived ability. This was determined experimentally by directly telling observers that they were extremely similar to the actor, especially in prose and in the form of responses to questioning. This research implies that similarities in attitude can be more significant in determining attractiveness, especially with the knowledge of congruence in attitude.

== Explanation ==
Aronson explained the results of this experiment and the pratfall effect as due to increased sympathy with successful individuals after they make a mistake. Later work has suggested that the pratfall effect is explained by self-comparison between blunderers and observers in addition to the observer's desire for accurate self-evaluations. The derogation toward an average actor appears after the actor commits the pratfall since humor allows the individuals to comfortably rate attractiveness more congruently with immediately felt (negative) emotions. These emotions vary based on the ability of the observer, with the average participant feeling the most discomfort due to the participant's similarity to the mediocre performer, and the performer's mistake. As a result of threatened self-esteem (in the observer), the perceived average individual's attractiveness is rated lower. The perceived able individual is rated higher after the pratfall since the able individual appears more relatable and therefore approachable and likeable.

An alternative explanation is that the pratfall effect is due to increased attention to the target individuals, which in turn results in better realization of their appropriateness and/or inappropriateness given the evaluation criteria.

== Examples ==
The pratfall effect is notably attributed to John F. Kennedy in the aftermath of the Bay of Pigs Invasion and to Apple Maps' initial failure.

== Applications ==
=== Marketing ===
Research on the potential positive effects of "blemishes" in product marketing suggests that in certain situations, desirability and eventual purchase decisions both increased after presenting a product blemish, but only under low-effort processing conditions, or when cognitive resources are low due to preoccupation or distraction. Under high-effort processing conditions, presenting a blemish decreased desirability and amounts of purchases. Primacy effects suggest that under low-effort processing conditions, positive effects create a reference point at which a product is evaluated, and conflicting negative information presented boosts the initial positive impression formed by the product.

This was demonstrated through research by approaching students before an exam—when students likely had their attention focused elsewhere—versus approaching students leisurely walking around and offering to sell them a chocolate bar. The chocolate bar was advertised positively: chilled, favored by consumers on a taste test, and offered at a discount. In the experimental condition, the chocolate bar was described as discounted since it was broken. The chocolate bar was packed in a transparent wrapper, so the broken piece of chocolate could clearly be seen by the students. Students in the low-effort experimental group were twice as likely to purchase the chocolate bar after being presented negative information, while in the high-effort group, students were half as likely to purchase the chocolate bar.
