= Merrill Carlsmith =

J. Merrill Carlsmith
- Born: April 12, 1936; New Orleans, Louisiana, US
- Died: April 19, 1984 (aged 48); Portola Valley, California, US
- Education: Harvard University
- Spouse: Lyn Carlsmith (m. 1963–1984)
- Children: Christopher Carlsmith, Kimberly Carlsmith Sampson, Kevin M. Carlsmith
- Scientific career
- Fields: Psychology
- Workplaces: Stanford University
- Thesis: Strength of Expectancy: Its Determinants and Effects (1963)
- Doctoral advisor: Elliot Aronson
- Doctoral students: Phoebe C. Ellsworth

James Merrill Carlsmith (April 12, 1936 – April 19, 1984) was an American social psychologist perhaps best known for his collaboration with Leon Festinger and Elliot Aronson in the creation and development of cognitive dissonance theory. He also worked extensively with Mark Lepper on the subject of attribution theory. With Jonathan L. Freedman and David O. Sears (his cousin) he wrote the textbook, Social Psychology (1970; subsequent editions published 1974, 1978, and 1981).

Carlsmith was married to social psychologist Lyn Carlsmith (born Karolyn Gai Kuckenberg, October 7, 1932 – September 1, 2011) from 1963 until his death, and had three children: Christopher, Kimberly, and Kevin (October 17, 1967 – November 19, 2011). He graduated from Stanford University and Harvard University.

== See also ==
- Insufficient justification § The forbidden toy experiment
- Forced Compliance Theory
