= Parallel constraint satisfaction processes =

In behavioral psychology, parallel constraint satisfaction processes (PCSP) is a model of human behavior that integrates connectionism, neural networks, and parallel distributed processing models.

== Dynamic model of attitude ==
This model integrates these three areas to propose a holistic explanation for an individual's response to cognitive dissonance. It models an explanation of the dynamic structure of attitudes and the attitude change involved in cognitive dissonance theory. PCSP posits that beliefs impose constraints on other beliefs, and conditions can either constrain or make salient different aspects of one's beliefs. Attitudes and beliefs are therefore changeable, due to trying to satisfactorily fit with the various constraints of circumstances as well as adapt to the constantly evolving truths in life. It is not an alternative to the theory but rather a model that incorporates the many facets of cognitive dissonance theory. Cognitive dissonance theory centers mainly on:

- Cognition
- Self-concept
- Social identity

Human beings may give greater importance to one of these areas but no single factor will be the sole influence. The different theories are probably all accurate given the right time, the right place, and the right individual, therefore an integrated more holistic model may better explain the reasons for attitude/behavior inconsistency and the change of attitude following cognitive dissonance.

== Gestalt psychology ==
Researchers (Read 1991) have found within Gestalt psychology an integrated model of explaining attitude change that incorporates neuroscientific and social psychological concepts. Theories of cognitive dissonance as well as its alternatives are based on the assumption that the attitudes and beliefs one holds are fixed entities. Recently psychologists have progressed from categorizing psychological phenomena as static, to recognizing the dynamic aspects that vary with different contexts. The concept of neural network models uses the Gestalt principle of totality to explain social, emotional and cognitive tendencies.

In a feedback or parallel constraint satisfaction network, activation passes around symmetrically connected nodes until the activation of all the nodes asymptotes or "relaxes" into a state that satisfies the constraints among the nodes. This process allows for the integration of a number of different sources of information in parallel.

== Social psychology ==
Parallel constraint satisfaction processes can be applied to three broad areas in social psychology:

- Impression formation and causal attribution
- Cognitive consistency
- Goal-directed behavior.

This approach revealed that some phenomena that seem unexpected or counterintuitive are in actuality due to the normal functioning of the cognitive system. For example, Shultz and Lepper (1996) noted that in thinking about cognitive dissonance in terms of parallel constraint satisfaction processes, it becomes clear that cognitive consistency phenomena—such as those studied by dissonance researchers—are not the result of atypical or unusual cognitive processes but rather are the direct result of normal cognitive functioning.

== See also ==
- Cognitive dissonance is the original concept of the theory.
- Self-perception theory is a competing theory of attitude change.
