= Elliot Aronson =

American psychologist (born 1932)

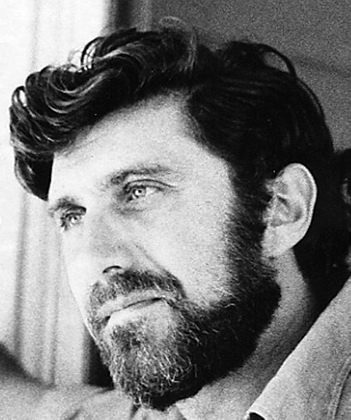
- Aronson in 1972
- Born: January 9, 1932 (age 94); Chelsea, Massachusetts, U.S.
- Education: Brandeis University (BA); Wesleyan University (MA); Stanford University (Ph.D.)
- Occupation: Psychologist
- Known for: research on cognitive dissonance, high-impact experimentation, Jigsaw Classroom, gain–loss theory of attraction
- Awards: AAAS Prize for Behavioral Science Research, APS William James Award
- Scientific career
- Fields: Social psychology, applied social psychology, media psychology
- Workplaces: Harvard University; University of Minnesota; University of Texas; University of California, Santa Cruz
- Doctoral advisor: Leon Festinger
- Doctoral students: Merrill Carlsmith, John Darley, Anthony Greenwald, Alexander Gonzalez

Elliot Aronson (born January 9, 1932) is an American psychologist who carried out experiments on the theory of cognitive dissonance, and invented the Jigsaw Classroom, a cooperative teaching technique that facilitates learning while reducing interethnic hostility and prejudice. In his widely-read 1972 social psychology book, The Social Animal, now in its twelfth edition, he laid out Aronson's First Law: "People who do crazy things are not necessarily crazy", thus asserting the importance of situational factors in disturbing behavior.

Aronson is the only person in the 120-year history of the American Psychological Association to have won all three of its major awards: for writing, for teaching, and for research. In 2007, he received the William James Award for Lifetime Achievement from the Association for Psychological Science, in which he was cited as the scientist who "fundamentally changed the way we look at everyday life". A Review of General Psychology survey, published in 2002, ranked Aronson as the 78th most cited psychologist of the 20th century. He officially retired in 1994 but continues to teach and write.

== Early life and education ==
Aronson grew up in extreme poverty in Revere, Massachusetts, during the Great Depression. His was the only Jewish family in the neighborhood, and it was not rare for Aronson to be bullied on the way home from Hebrew school by anti-Semitic gangs. He believes that every life's progress is based on a combination of luck, opportunity, talent, and intuition. Although his high school grades were mediocre, his SAT scores were high enough to earn him a work-study scholarship at Brandeis University.

Influenced by his father, he began his college career majoring in economics. However, he promptly changed his major to psychology after accidentally wandering into an introductory psychology lecture taught by Abraham Maslow. After attending this lecture, he realized that there was an entire science devoted to exploring the kinds of questions that had intrigued him as a child. His undergraduate years at Brandeis brought him closer to a number of respected psychologists, but Maslow was his primary mentor and had the biggest impact on his early academic career.

Aronson earned his bachelor's degree from Brandeis in 1954. He went on to earn a master's degree from Wesleyan University in 1956, where he worked with David McClelland, and a Ph.D. in psychology from Stanford University in 1959, where his doctoral advisor and mentor was the experimental social psychologist Leon Festinger.

== Professional history ==
Aronson has taught at Harvard University, the University of Minnesota, the University of Texas, and the University of California, Santa Cruz. He also served as distinguished visiting professor at Stanford University. He was included in a list of the 100 most influential psychologists of the 20th century published by the Review of General Psychology.

=== Recognition ===
Aronson was elected to the American Academy of Arts and Sciences and won the William James Award from the Association for Psychological Science for his lifetime achievements. His honors include distinguished research awards from the American Psychological Association, the American Association for the Advancement of Science and the Society of Experimental Social Psychology. He also won the Gordon Allport Prize for his work on reducing prejudice. In 1981 he was one of five academics awarded "Professor of the Year" by the Council for the Advancement and Support of Education.

== Research topics ==
=== Cognitive dissonance ===
Aronson's interests and research have paid particular attention to the theory of cognitive dissonance. Aronson refined the theory, which posits that when attitudes and behaviors are inconsistent (dissonant), psychological discomfort results. This discomfort motivates the person experiencing it to either change the behavior or the attitude so that consonance is restored. In a classic experiment, Aronson demonstrated that people who undergo an embarrassing initiation to gain admission to a group develop more favorable evaluations of the group than people who are admitted after a mild or easy initiation. In Aronson's Theories of Cognitive Consistency (1973), he states: "Dissonance theory does not rest upon the assumption that man is a rational animal; rather, it suggests that man is a rationalizing animal – that he attempts to appear rational, both to others and to himself."

=== Jigsaw Classroom ===
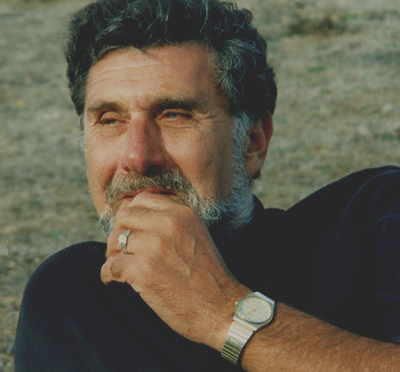
Aronson in 2001, shortly after he began to lose his eyesight to macular degeneration

Aronson led the development of a classroom technique for defusing inter-group tension and promoting self-esteem. It was discovered that it is rare for classrooms of students to cooperate towards a common goal. In 1971 the newly desegregated schools of Austin, Texas, faced a crisis of violence between ethnic groups. Aronson, then at the University of Texas, was called in as a consultant by a school administrator who was also a former student. He noticed that the schools' highly competitive atmosphere was exacerbating the already tense ethnic rivalry. Together with his graduate students, Aronson developed a model of teaching practice to encourage a culture of shared goals and mutual support.

In the jigsaw classroom approach, pupils are divided into small groups, mixed by race and by ability, to work co-operatively on a task. The classroom material—for example a biography of a historical figure—is broken into sections, and one member of each group is responsible for reading each section. Members with the same role from each group gather in "expert groups" to discuss their sections. They then return to their own groups and take turns to present what they have learned. They are then assessed individually on all sections of the material. This division of responsibilities means that students are motivated to listen to each other and each of them experiences a role in which they are valuable to others.

Comparisons with traditional classroom environments showed that the jigsaw classroom has positive effects on academic performance, self-esteem and attitudes towards other ethnic groups. The technique has since been applied in hundreds of schools across North America. From its initial application at third- to fifth-grade school level, it has been expanded to other educational levels. This success encouraged Aronson to apply his research to other policy issues including energy conservation and the treatment of the elderly. In the aftermath of the Columbine High School massacre, Aronson advocated for jigsaw classrooms as part of an approach to defusing the social divisions underlying school violence.

=== Gain–loss theory of attraction ===
In 1965, Aronson proposed that interpersonal attraction and liking could be understood in terms of the balance of reward and cost. This implied that contrast—a gain or loss of positive feedback from the other person—has more effect on liking than the absolute level of feedback. An example is how compliments are more meaningful when they come from someone who is usually critical, rather than from a reliable supporter. Another example is that a couple may feel more dedicated to their relationship if they initially disliked each other.

=== Pratfall effect ===
Aronson published a paper in 1966, where he described an experiment testing the effects of a simple blunder on perceived attraction. The so-called pratfall effect is the tendency for attractiveness to increase or decrease after an individual makes a mistake, depending on the individual's perceived competence, or ability to perform well in a general sense.

== Awards and professional recognition ==
Award	Awarding body	Year	Source
Award for Distinguished Research in Social Psychology	American Association for the Advancement of Science	1970	
Fellowship	Center for Advanced Study in the Behavioral Sciences	1970–1971, 1977–1978	
National Media Award	American Psychological Association	1973	
Teaching Award	University of Texas	1973	
Teaching Award in Psychology	American Psychological Association	1980	
Donald T. Campbell Award for distinguished contributions in social psychology	American Psychological Association	1980	
Professor of the Year	Council for the Advancement and Support of Education	1981	
Gordon Allport Prize for Inter-Group Relations	Society for the Psychological Study of Social Issues	1981	
Guggenheim Fellowship	John Simon Guggenheim Memorial Foundation	1981–1982	
Fellowship	American Academy of Arts and Sciences	1992	
Award for Distinguished Research in the Social Sciences	University of California, Santa Cruz	1992	
Distinguished Scientific Career Award	Society of Experimental Social Psychology	1994	
Distinguished Scientific Contribution Award	American Psychological Association	1999	
Master Lecturer	American Psychological Association	2001	
William James Fellow Award for Distinguished Lifetime Contributions to Scientific Psychology	Association for Psychological Science	2007	

== Personal life ==
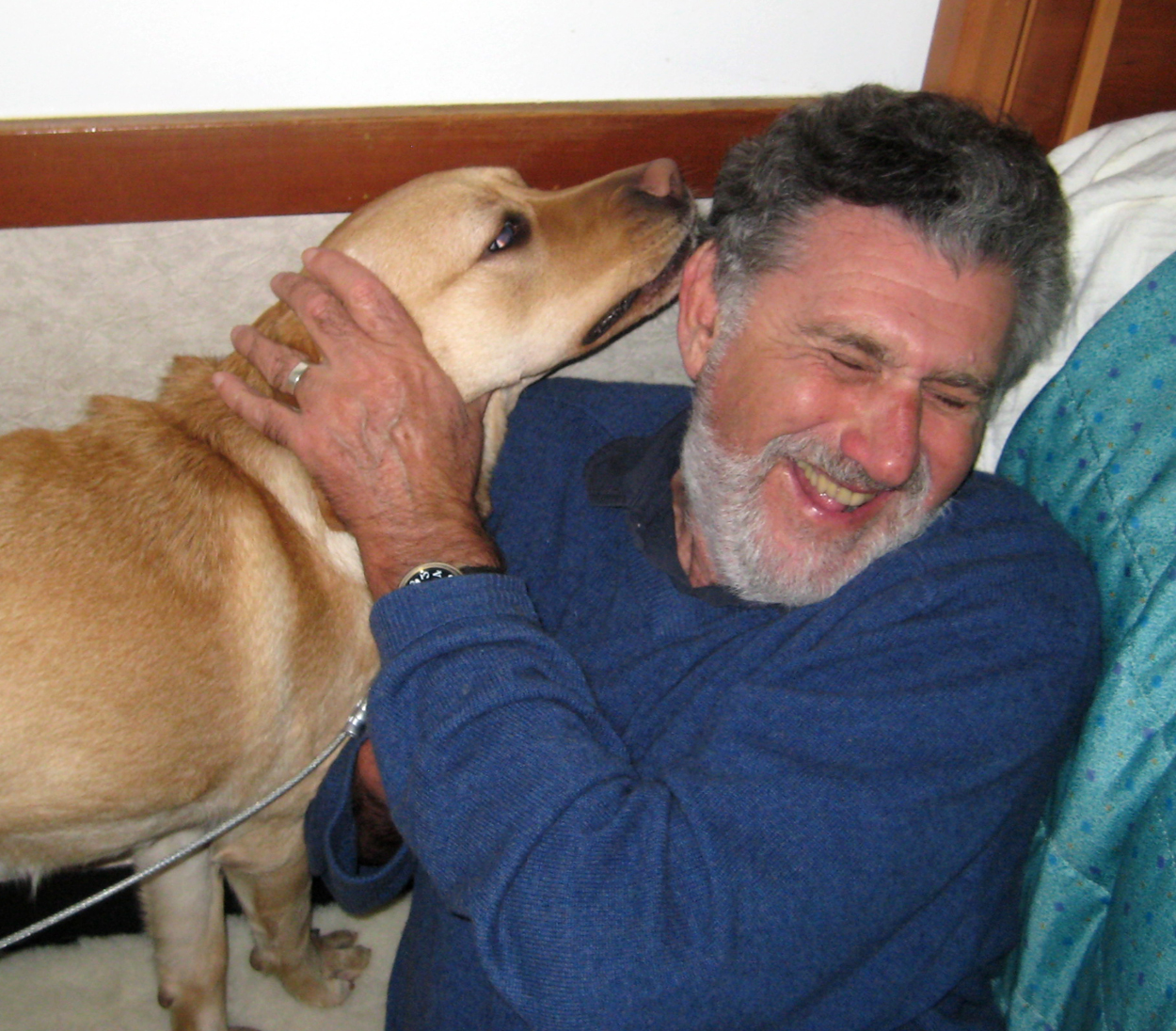
Aronson with his Labrador Retriever guide dog Desi-Lu in 2011

Elliot is married to Vera Aronson, whom he met while they were both undergraduate research assistants under Abraham Maslow. Together they have had four children: Hal, Neal, Julie and Joshua, who is himself a social psychologist.

In 2000, Aronson was diagnosed with macular degeneration and, by 2003, had lost all of his central vision. To cope with his blindness, Aronson decided to get a guide dog, and applied at Guide Dogs for the Blind in 2010. In January 2011 he began a three-week training session with his new guide dog, Desilu, nicknamed Desi. He graduated from the program on February 12, 2011. He said, "They worked us 14 hours a day, until we were almost as smart as our dogs."

== Bibliography ==
Aronson has written more than twenty books, including textbooks, popularizations and one book of children's fiction with his granddaughter Ruth Aronson. In 2010, Psychology Press published a book of essays and scholarly articles by his friends, colleagues, and former students celebrating his influence on their work: The Scientist and the Humanist: A Festschrift in Honor of Elliot Aronson.

=== Academic books ===
- Lindzey, G., & Aronson, E. (1968 & 1985). The handbook of social psychology (2nd & 3rd eds.). New York: Random House.
- Stern, P. C., & Aronson, E. (1984). Energy use: The human dimension. New York: W. H. Freeman.
- Pines, A. & Aronson, E. (1988). Career burnout. New York: Free Press.
- Aronson, E., Ellsworth, P., Carlsmith, J. M., & Gonzales, M. (1990). Methods of research in social psychology (2nd ed.). New York: McGraw-Hill.
- Aronson, E., & Pratkanis, A. R. (1993). Social psychology: The most outstanding research (Vol. 1, 2, & 3). London: Elgar Ltd.
- Aronson, E. (2000). Nobody left to hate: Teaching compassion after Columbine. New York: Henry Holt.
- Pratkanis, A. R., & Aronson, E. (2001). Age of propaganda: The everyday use and abuse of persuasion. New York: Henry Holt.
- Tavris, C., & Aronson, E. (2015). Mistakes were made (but not by Me): Why we justify foolish beliefs, bad decisions, and hurtful acts (Rev. ed) New York: Harcourt. ISBN 978-0-54-457478-6
- Aronson, E., & Patnoe, S. (2011). Cooperation in the Classroom: The Jigsaw Method (3rd ed.). New York: Pinter & Martin Ltd. ISBN 1-9051-7722-4
- Aronson, E. (2011). The Social Animal (11th ed.). New York: Worth/Freeman. ISBN 1-4292-3341-9
- Aronson, J., & Aronson, E. (eds). (2011). Readings about the social animal (11th ed.). New York: Worth/Freeman. ISBN 1-4292-3342-7
- Aronson, E., Wilson, T. D., Akert, R. M., & Sommers S. R. (2015). Social psychology (9th ed.). New York: Prentice Hall. ISBN 0-1339-3654-6

=== Autobiography ===
- Aronson, E. (2002). "Drifting my own way: Following my nose and my heart." In R. Sternberg (Ed.) (2003) Psychologists defying the crowd: Stories of those who battled the establishment and won. Washington, DC: APA Books. ISBN 978-1-55798-919-2
- Aronson, Elliot (2007), "Elliot Aronson", in Lindzey, Gardner; McKinley Runyan, William (eds.), A History of psychology in autobiography, volume 9, American Psychological Association, pp. 3–42, ISBN 978-1-59147-796-9
- Aronson, E. (2010). Not by chance alone: My life as a social psychologist. New York: Basic Books. ISBN 978-0-465-01833-8

=== Fiction ===
- Aronson, E., & R. Aronson (2005). The Adventures of Ruthie and a Little Boy Named Grandpa (a children's book). iUniverse.

== See also ==
- Insufficient justification § The forbidden toy experiment
- List of social psychologists
