= Jigsaw (teaching technique) =

The jigsaw technique is a method of organizing classroom activity that makes students dependent on each other to succeed. It breaks classes into groups that each assemble a piece of an assignment and synthesize their work when finished. It was designed by social psychologist Elliot Aronson to help weaken racial cliques in forcibly integrated schools. A study by John Hattie found that the jigsaw method benefits students' learning.

The technique splits classes into mixed groups to work on small problems that the group collates into an outcome. For example, an in-class assignment is divided into topics. Students are then split into groups with one member assigned to each topic. Working individually, each student learns about their topic and presents it to their group. Next, students gather into groups divided by topic. Each member presents again to the topic group. In same-topic groups, students reconcile points of view and synthesize information. They create a final report. Finally, the original groups reconvene and listen to presentations from each member. The final presentations provide all group members with an understanding of their own material, as well as the findings that have emerged from topic-specific group discussion.

The jigsaw technique is a cooperative learning method that brings about both individual accountability and achievement of the team goals. The process derives its name from the jigsaw puzzle because it involves putting the parts of the assignment together to form a whole picture. The assignment is divided into parts and the class is also divided into the same number of groups as that of the assignment. Each of these group is given a different topic and allowed to learn about it. These groups are shuffled to form new groups consisting of members from each group.

== History ==
In the late 1950s, America was going through desegregation of public schools. In 1954, the Brown v. Board of Education decision of the Supreme Court of the United States created a legal requirement for integration of public schools by ruling that separating schools made them inherently unequal. Actual integration was a painful process, taking years.

Schools were plagued with fights, discrimination, and hate crimes. White supremacist groups and hateful white students terrorized new students. This prevented students from feeling safe in their schools and harmed all their learning abilities. Students often could hardly sit in the same room together without incident, much less work together. This created a problem for teachers, students, parents, communities, and the country alike, as an entire generation of students were distracted from learning by rampant hatred and discrimination.

It was at this time that psychologists were pulled in to advise schools on what to do to correct this problem. In 1971, Dr. Elliot Aronson was hired to advise an Austin, Texas school district on how to defuse the problems of hostile classrooms and distrust between the students. Aronson was a psychologist at the University of Texas at Austin at the time, and took a psychological approach to help fix the problems in the classrooms. Competition among students had become extremely high. It was quickly realized that the competitive nature of the classroom encouraged students to taunt each other and discriminate against those different from them, so that they might vault themselves higher in status. In order to counter this problem, students were placed in diversified groups so that they would be required to work together and reduce the competitive atmosphere. Students were having difficulty adjusting to the mixing of ethnicity in the classroom. Aronson created an atmosphere for increased collaboration and reduction of the resistance to work with one another. Aronson created assignments that made every member of the group equally important. The students had to pay attention and obtain much information from other group members. This allows for each member of the group to add a small piece of the larger picture so that they are all important to the group. This teaches the students to rely on each other and reduces their competitive attitudes toward each other because they need everyone in their group to do well because their grade depends on the other students.

== Research findings ==
Students in jigsaw classrooms ("jigsaws") showed a decrease in prejudice and stereotyping, liked in-group and out-group members more, showed higher levels of self-esteem, performed better on standardized exams, liked school more, reduced absenteeism, and mixed with students of other races in areas other than the classroom compared to students in traditional classrooms ("trads"). The experiment also increased empathetic role-taking. Students were able to understand things from another student's perspective."

=== Bridgeman ===
Diane Bridgeman demonstrated that jigsaws displayed greater empathy than trads. She assessed fifth-graders.

Half of her subjects had spent two months in a jigsaw classroom while the other half were in a traditional classroom. The children viewed cartoons to assess their empathy. Trads displayed lower empathy than jigsaws.

=== Geffner ===
Geffner assessed fifth-graders' attitudes about themselves, school, and other students. He worked in the Santa Cruz County, California, school district which had a ratio of 50% Caucasian students to 50% Hispanic students. He assessed trads, jigsaws and students in classrooms that used a cooperative technique that did not rely on interdependence ("coops"). He used a modified version of Blaney's questionnaire and a modified version of the Pictorial Concept Scale for Children. This scale placed cartoon stick figures in various situations, including five self-esteem dimensions: athletic abilities, scholastic abilities, physical appearance, family interactions and social interactions. These measures were used as pre- and post-intervention measures. Interventions lasted eight weeks.

Coops and jigsaws improved or maintained positive attitudes about themselves, school, peers and academic abilities and self-esteem. Trads demonstrated poorer attitudes about peers, themselves, and academic abilities.

=== Blaney, Stephan, Rosenfield, Aronson and Sikes ===
The first experiment with the jigsaw classroom was by Blaney, Stephan, Rosenfield, Aronson, and Sikes in 1977. The technique was assessed in ten fifth grade classes across seven schools.

Three fifth grade classes from each school were the controls. Trad teachers were peer-rated as good teachers. The experimental classes worked in jigsaw groups for 45 minutes a day, three days a week, for six weeks. Both groups used similar curricula. The jigsaw groups contained members from all ethnic groups. Student questionnaires assessed attitudes about themselves, school and toward peer teaching, cooperation and attitudes towards group members other students in the class. These measures were used as pre- and post-intervention.

Significant increases were seen in jigsaw self-esteem accompanied by a decrease in trad self-esteem. Jigsaw students liked school more, (Caucasians generally, Mexican-Americans slightly, but not African-Americans.) Trad students liked school less (Caucasians generally, not Mexican-Americans, and African-Americans significantly.) The authors contribute this to the fact that Mexican-American jigsaws may have felt forced to participate in peer teaching. Two other questions produced significant results. Competitiveness among jigsaws decreased and increased among trads. Jigsaws felt they could learn more from other students while trads did not. Students reported increase liking of their group members, but they also increased their liking of other students in the class.

=== Hänze and Berger ===
Hänze and Berger assessed 12th-grade physics classes in 2007. They took eight 12th-grade classes and randomly assigned them to either the jigsaw technique or direct instruction. Students were assessed for academic performance and completed a questionnaire looking at personality variables (goal orientation, self-concept, and uncertainty orientation). The topics (motion of electrons and electromagnetic oscillations and waves) were introduced through direct instruction in both branches. Students completed the learning experience questionnaire after the instruction as a pretest measure. Jigsaws were given the learning experience questionnaire after working in the expert group and after working in the jigsaw group. Trads were given the learning experience questionnaire at the end of the lesson.

Academic performance was reassessed a few days after the learning unit. Clear difference emerged in the learning experience, but not in academic performances. Jigsaws showed higher achievement in their "expert" areas, but trads scored better on areas that jigsaws learned from their peers. Jigsaws had a more favorable view of the learning experience, stronger intrinsic motivation, greater interest in the topic and more cognitive activation and involvement than trads. Jigsaws were more involved and more interested in the material and were seen as more competent, more socially related to other students and more autonomous. Indirect effects on performance were implied because students viewed themselves as more competent, but without direct impact on achievement.

=== Perkins and Saris ===
Perkins and Saris assessed an undergraduate statistics course in 2001. They noted that a part of class instruction was doing worksheets. Worksheets give immediate feedback, allow for repeated practice, make students active rather than passive learners and allow students to ask for help from the instructor. Drawbacks include students' uneven readiness the substantial time required to complete.

Students worked in groups on two occasions. In the first, four worksheets were supplied. Pairs of students were given the same worksheet and worked together to compute various statistical quantities. For the first study an example of the computation and interpretation were provided. After discussion, students received one of two worksheets that directed them through the steps for completing the procedures for one of the remaining designs with a partial solution for each step.

The handout also contained the next-to-last step for the other design. One group of students received step-by-step instruction and partial solutions for the second and a nearly complete solution for the third design and the other group received step-by-step information for the third design and the almost complete solution for the second. Students were instructed to work with a classmate holding a complementary handout. Students were then asked to rate the exercise on usefulness of getting help, giving help, working with classmates, providing an alternative to a lecture, saving time and understanding the statistical procedures.

Students perceived the jigsaw procedure as being very positive especially as an alternative learning experience. Jigsaws rated the technique as more useful for practical purposes than for interpersonal purposes such as working with others or giving/getting help. Students appreciated the technique as a time-saver and viewed it is a change of pace.

=== Walker and Crogan ===
Walker and Crogan looked at the effects of a cooperative learning environment, the jigsaw method and traditional classes on academic performance, self-esteem, liking of school, liking of peers and racial prejudice in Australia. They looked at 103 students in grades 4–6 at one private and one public school. Cooperative learning was used as a baseline measure for the effects of cooperation.

The sixth-grade and fifth grade classes hosted coops and trads, respectively. The study was confounded by changes in procedures for the coops and the departure of the trad teacher, resulting in a shortened, four week schedule. The choice to designate the sixth grade class as "traditional cooperation" rather than "failed jigsaw" was criticized by Bratt. In the public school, a fourth-grade class experienced a three-week jigsaw program. The trad class was a split fourth/fifth-grade class. Each experimental branch had a same-school control.

For the private school, there were 31 students in the experimental group and 29 students in the control group. At the public school, there were 20 students and two teachers in the experimental group, with 23 students and only one teacher in the control group. Teachers were given a description of the program and the key facts were discussed with them.

Public school jigsaw groups balanced ethnicity, academic ability and sex evenly. "Best" friends and "worst" enemies were separated. Prior to implementation, jigsaws familiarized themselves with their group peers, practiced their roles as peer tutors and practiced relevant skills such as discussing main ideas, reading for meaning, listening and quizzing peers on important information.

At the private school, students in the experimental class received the cooperative learning program for 90 minutes each day, twice a week, for four weeks. At the public school, students in the experimental class received the Jigsaw program for an hour a day, five days a week, for three weeks. Measures were taken pre- and post-intervention. Academic performance data was available only from the public school. Self-esteem was measured by the Piers-Harris Children's Self-concept Scale (CSCS). Students rated their classmates according to how much they would like to work and play with them. Racial prejudice measures were assessed students' attitudes to Asian-Australians, Aboriginal peoples and European-Australians using one measure of social distance and one of stereotyping.

Academic performance improved for those in the Jigsaw group. Jigsaw self-esteem increased at both schools compared to trads, for liking of school and for playing with peers but the gains were not significant. Jigsaws increased their ratings in working with peers when compared to their relative control group. Coops were not motivated by the prospect of working cooperatively.

Jigsaws liked ingroup and outgroup peers more in work-oriented relationships, but not for coops. Social distance ratings for Asian-Australian and European-Australian children decreased across the program, but European-Australian ratings increased. Jigsaws attributed fewer negative traits to Asian- and European-Australians. Coops showed an increase in stereotyping. The study demonstrated that the Jigsaw method is effective in Australian social conditions in producing positive change in academic performance, attitudes to peers and prejudice. Cooperative learning on the other hand produced generally negative results. Interdependence seemed to be more important than cooperation.

=== Bratt ===
Bratt presented two studies on Jigsaw, one in grade 6 (Study 1), one in grades 8 to 10 (Study 2). Bratt focused on the claimed effectiveness of Jigsaw to reduce prejudice. The first study gave similar findings as Walker and Crogan, but Bratt stressed that the data could not be interpreted as establishing positive Jigsaw effects. Bratt's Study 1 included two schools, with one Jigsaw class and one control class at each school. The experiment covered seven weeks. The analysis focused on ethnic Norwegian children (n = 34 in each class).

The study of sixth graders was confounded by the fact that the Jigsaw class had two teachers whereas the control class had only one teacher.

Study 2 assessed 11 Jigsaw classes and 11 matched control classes. Jigsaw teachers were well trained and repeatedly met during the eight-week experiment. The analysis focused on 264 ethnic Norwegian students. Study 2 failed to indicate effects of Jigsaw on intergroup attitudes, cross-group friendship, common ingroup identity, empathy and attitudes toward school. These variables were measured before, immediately after and six months after the first measure.

Bratt concluded that the two studies did not support Jigsaw. Bratt also pointed out methodological limitations in previous studies, arguing that due to these limitations there was still no empirical evidence to conclude that the Jigsaw technique reduces prejudice. For instance, Walker and Crogan reclassified a Jigsaw class as a control class after the Jigsaw technique failed in this class.

== See also ==
- Learning by teaching
- Flip teaching
