= Cognitive dissonance =

Mental phenomenon of holding contradictory beliefs

In the field of psychology, cognitive dissonance is described as a mental phenomenon in which people unknowingly or subconsciously hold fundamentally conflicting cognitions. Being confronted by situations that create this dissonance or highlight these inconsistencies motivates change in their cognitions or actions to reduce this dissonance, maybe by changing a belief, by explaining something away, or by taking actions that reduce perceived inconsistency.

Relevant items of cognition include people's actions, feelings, ideas, beliefs, values, and things in the environment. Cognitive dissonance exists without outward sign, but surfaces through psychological stress when psychological discomfort is created due to persons participating in an action that creates conflicting beliefs, attitudes, or behaviors, or when new information challenges existing beliefs.

According to this theory, when an action or idea is psychologically inconsistent with the other, people automatically try to resolve the conflict, usually by reframing a side to make the combination congruent. Discomfort is triggered by beliefs clashing with new information or by having to conceptually resolve a matter that involves conflicting sides, whereby the individual tries to find a way to reconcile contradictions to reduce their discomfort. This need to reduce discomfort can be used for applied interventions as a catalyst for attitudinal change, such as in the induced hypocrisy paradigm, shaping pro-social behaviours or disengaging and deradicalising extremists.

In When Prophecy Fails (1956) and A Theory of Cognitive Dissonance (1957), Leon Festinger proposed that human beings strive for internal psychological consistency to function mentally in the real world. Persons who experience internal inconsistency tend to become psychologically uncomfortable and are motivated to reduce the cognitive dissonance. They tend to make changes to justify the stressful behavior, by either adding new parts to the cognition causing the psychological dissonance (rationalization), believing that "people get what they deserve" (just-world fallacy), taking in specific pieces of information while rejecting or ignoring others (selective perception), or avoiding circumstances and contradictory information likely to increase the magnitude of the cognitive dissonance (confirmation bias). Festinger's cognitive dissonance theory is still one of the most influential social theories in modern social psychology. Festinger explains avoiding cognitive dissonance as "Tell him you disagree and he turns away. Show him facts or figures and he questions your sources. Appeal to logic and he fails to see your point."

== Originator ==
Leon Festinger, born in 1919 in New York City, was an American social psychologist whose contributions to psychology include cognitive dissonance theory, social comparison theory, and the proximity effect. In a 2002 American Psychological Association article, Festinger is cited as the fifth most eminent psychologist of the 20th century, just after B.F. Skinner, Jean Piaget, Sigmund Freud, and Albert Bandura, respectively.

In 1957, Leon Festinger introduced the theory of Cognitive Dissonance, which describes how psychological stress occurs when a person has cognitive inconsistencies, such as conflicting behaviors, attitudes, or beliefs. As mentioned in Persuasion and Influence in American Life, instead of perpetuating a constant state of psychological tension, people often try to reclaim their mental balance by rationalizing the behavior in question or by adjusting their beliefs. The framework of Festinger's theory, as well as his fascination with the way people evaluate their beliefs and internal inconsistencies, was influenced in part by his earlier work on Social Comparison Theory, which is important when trying to explain why the tension arises from dissonance.

Festinger graduated from the City College of New York in 1939; he then received his PhD in Child Psychology from the University of Iowa. He was initially inspired to enter the field of psychology by Kurt Lewin, known as the "father of modern social psychology", and his work in Gestalt psychology. Studying under Kurt Lewin for most of his academic career, Festinger returned to collaborate with Lewin at the Research Center for Group Dynamics at the Massachusetts Institute of Technology.

Throughout this research, Festinger noticed that people often like to stick to consistent habits and routines to maintain order within their lives. These habits may include everyday activities like preferring a specific seat during their daily commute or eating meals at consistent times. Any disturbance to this order can lead to mental unease, which may manifest in altered thought processes or beliefs. Festinger concluded that the sole means of alleviating this discomfort is by adjusting either their actions or beliefs to restore consistency.

Since his publication of A Theory of Cognitive Dissonance in 1957, Festinger's findings have helped to understand peoples' personal biases, how people reframe situations in their heads to maintain a positive self-image, and why one may pursue certain behaviors that misalign with their judgments as they seek out or reject certain information.

== Relations among cognitions ==
To function in the reality of society, human beings continually adjust the correspondence of their mental attitudes and personal actions; such continual adjustments, between cognition and action, result in one of three relationships with reality:

1. Consonant relationship: A cognition or action consistent with the other, e.g., not wanting to become drunk when out for dinner and ordering water rather than wine
2. Irrelevant relationship: A cognition or action unrelated to the other, e.g. not wanting to become drunk when out and wearing a blue shirt
3. Dissonant relationship: A cognition or action inconsistent with the other, e.g. not wanting to become drunk when out, but then drinking more wine anyway

=== Magnitude of dissonance ===
The term "magnitude of dissonance" refers to the level of discomfort caused to the person. This can be caused by the relationship between two different internal beliefs, or an action that is incompatible with the beliefs of the person. Two factors determine the degree of psychological dissonance caused by two conflicting cognitions or by two conflicting actions:

1. The importance of cognitions: the greater the personal value of the elements, the greater the magnitude of the dissonance in the relation. When the value of the importance of the two dissonant items is high, it is difficult to determine which action or thought is correct. Both have had a place of truth, at least subjectively, in the mind of the person. Therefore, when the ideals or actions now clash, it is difficult for the individual to decide which takes priority.
2. Ratio of cognitions: the proportion of dissonant-to-consonant elements. There is a level of discomfort within each person that is acceptable for living. When a person is within that comfort level, the dissonant factors do not interfere with functioning. However, when dissonant factors are abundant and not enough in line with each other, one goes through a process to regulate and bring the ratio back to an acceptable level. Once a subject chooses to keep one of the dissonant factors, they quickly forget the other to restore peace of mind.

There is always some degree of dissonance within a person as they go about making decisions, due to the changing quantity and quality of knowledge and wisdom that they gain. The magnitude itself is a subjective measurement since the reports are self relayed, and there is no objective way as yet to get a clear measurement of the level of discomfort.

== Reduction ==
Cognitive dissonance theory proposes that people seek psychological consistency between their expectations of life and the existential reality of the world. To function by that expectation of existential consistency, people continually reduce their cognitive dissonance in order to align their cognitions (perceptions of the world) with each other and their actions.

The creation and establishment of psychological consistency allows the person affected with cognitive dissonance to lessen mental stress by actions that reduce the magnitude of the dissonance, realized either by changing with or by justifying against or by being indifferent to the existential contradiction that is inducing the mental stress. In practice, people reduce the magnitude of their cognitive dissonance in four ways:

1. Change the behavior or the cognition ("I'll eat no more of this doughnut.")
2. Justify the behavior or the cognition, by changing the conflicting cognition ("I'm allowed to cheat my diet every once in a while.")
3. Justify the behavior or the cognition by adding new behaviors or cognitions ("I'll spend thirty extra minutes at the gymnasium to work off the doughnut.")
4. Ignore or deny information that conflicts with existing beliefs ("This doughnut is not a high-sugar food.")

Three cognitive bias theories are proposed proponents of cognitive dissonance (Note: they are not distinct, they draw from each other): 1. Bias Blind Spot — the tendency to perceive oneself as less susceptible to biases than others, 2. The Better-Than-Average-Effect — the tendency to believe that one is overall superior to others in terms of ability and character, and 3. Confirmation Bias — the tendency to interpret and understand information in a way that supports preexisting beliefs, thoughts, feelings, etc.

Having congruent, or perceived as congruent cognition is required in order to function in the real world according to the results of The Psychology of Prejudice (2006), wherein people facilitate their functioning in the real world by employing human categories (i.e. sex and gender, age and race, etc.) with which they manage their social interactions with other people.

Based on a brief overview of models and theories related to cognitive consistency from many different scientific fields, such as social psychology, perception, neurocognition, learning, motor control, system control, ethology, and stress, it has even been proposed that "all behaviour involving cognitive processing is caused by the activation of inconsistent cognitions and functions to increase perceived consistency"; that is, all behaviour functions to reduce cognitive inconsistency at some level of information processing. Indeed, the involvement of cognitive inconsistency has long been suggested for behaviors related to for instance curiosity, and aggression and fear, while it has also been suggested that the inability to satisfactorily reduce cognitive inconsistency may – dependent on the type and size of the inconsistency – result in stress.

=== Selective exposure ===
Another means to reduce cognitive dissonance is selective exposure. This theory has been discussed since the early days of Festinger's proposal of cognitive dissonance. He noticed that people would selectively expose themselves to some media over others; specifically, they would avoid dissonant messages and prefer consonant messages. Through selective exposure, people actively (and selectively) choose what to watch, view, or read that fit to their current state of mind, mood or beliefs. In other words, consumers select attitude-consistent information and avoid attitude-challenging information. This can be applied to media, news, music, and any other messaging channel. The idea is, choosing something that is in opposition to how you feel or believe in will increase cognitive dissonance.

For example, a study was done in an elderly home in 1992 on the loneliest residents—those that did not have family or frequent visitors. The residents were shown a series of documentaries: three that featured a "very happy, successful elderly person", and three that featured an "unhappy, lonely elderly person." After watching the documentaries, the residents indicated they preferred the media featuring the unhappy, lonely person over the happy person. This can be attested to them feeling lonely, and experiencing cognitive dissonance watching somebody their age feeling happy and being successful. This study explains how people select media that aligns with their mood, as in selectively exposing themselves to people and experiences they are already experiencing. It is more comfortable to see a movie about a character that is similar to you than to watch one about someone who is your age who is more successful than you.

Another example to note is how people mostly consume media that aligns with their political views. In a study done in 2015, participants were shown "attitudinally consistent, challenging, or politically balanced online news." Results showed that the participants trusted attitude-consistent news the most out of all the others, regardless of the source. It is evident that the participants actively selected media that aligns with their beliefs rather than opposing media.

In fact, recent research has suggested that while a discrepancy between cognitions drives individuals to crave for attitude-consistent information, the experience of negative emotions drives individuals to avoid counter attitudinal information. In other words, it is the psychological discomfort which activates selective exposure as a dissonance-reduction strategy.

== Paradigms ==
There are four theoretic paradigms of cognitive dissonance, the mental stress people experienced when exposed to information that is inconsistent with their beliefs, ideals or values: Belief Disconfirmation, Induced Compliance, Free Choice, and Effort Justification, which respectively explain what happens after a person acts inconsistently, relative to their intellectual perspectives; what happens after a person makes decisions and what are the effects upon a person who has expended much effort to achieve a goal. Common to each paradigm of cognitive-dissonance theory is the tenet: People invested in a given perspective shall—when confronted with contrary evidence—expend great effort to justify retaining the challenged perspective.

=== Belief disconfirmation ===
The contradiction of a belief, ideal, or system of values causes cognitive dissonance that can be resolved by changing the challenged belief, yet, instead of affecting change, the resultant mental stress restores psychological consonance to the person by misperception, rejection, or refutation of the contradiction, seeking moral support from people who share the contradicted beliefs or acting to persuade other people that the contradiction is unreal.

The early hypothesis of belief contradiction presented in When Prophecy Fails (1956) reported that faith deepened among the members of an apocalyptic religious cult, despite the failed prophecy of an alien spacecraft soon to land on Earth to rescue them from earthly corruption. At the determined place and time, the cult assembled; they believed that only they would survive planetary destruction; yet the spaceship did not arrive to Earth. The confounded prophecy caused them acute cognitive-dissonance: Had they been victims of a hoax? Had they vainly donated away their material possessions? To resolve the dissonance between apocalyptic, end-of-the-world religious beliefs and earthly, material reality, most of the cult restored their psychological consonance by choosing to believe a less mentally-stressful idea to explain the missed landing: that the aliens had given planet Earth a second chance at existence, which, in turn, empowered them to re-direct their religious cult to environmentalism and social advocacy to end human damage to planet Earth. On overcoming the confounded belief by changing to global environmentalism, the cult increased in numbers by proselytism.

The study of The Rebbe, the Messiah, and the Scandal of Orthodox Indifference (2008) reported the belief contradiction that occurred in the Chabad Orthodox Jewish congregation, who believed that their Rebbe, Menachem Mendel Schneerson, was the Messiah. When he died of a stroke in 1994, instead of accepting that their Rebbe was not the Messiah, some of the congregation proved indifferent to that contradictory fact, and continued claiming that Schneerson was the Messiah and that he would soon return from the dead.

=== Induced compliance ===
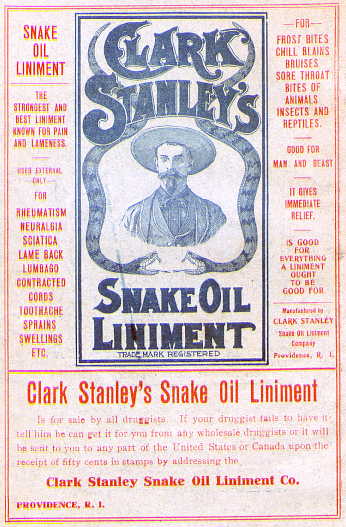
After performing dissonant behavior (lying) a person might find external, consonant elements. Therefore, a snake oil salesman might find a psychological self-justification (great profit) for promoting medical falsehoods, but, otherwise, might need to change his beliefs about the falsehoods.

In the Cognitive Consequences of Forced Compliance (1959), the investigators Leon Festinger and Merrill Carlsmith asked students to spend an hour doing tedious tasks; e.g. turning pegs a quarter-turn, at fixed intervals. This procedure included seventy-one male students attending Stanford University. Students were asked to complete a series of repetitive, mundane tasks, then asked to convince a separate group of participants that the task was fun and exciting. Once the subjects had done the tasks, the experimenters asked one group of subjects to speak with another subject (an actor) and persuade that impostor-subject that the tedious tasks were interesting and engaging. Subjects of one group were paid twenty dollars ($20); those in a second group were paid one dollar ($1) and those in the control group were not asked to speak with the imposter-subject.

At the conclusion of the study, when asked to rate the tedious tasks, the subjects of the second group (paid $1) rated the tasks more positively than did the subjects in the first group (paid $20), and the first group (paid $20) rated the tasks just slightly more positively than did the subjects of the control group; the responses of the paid subjects were evidence of cognitive dissonance. The researchers, Festinger and Carlsmith, proposed that the subjects experienced dissonance between the conflicting cognitions. "I told someone that the task was interesting" and "I actually found it boring." The subjects paid one dollar were induced to comply, compelled to internalize the "interesting task" mental attitude because they had no other justification. The subjects paid twenty dollars were induced to comply by way of an obvious, external justification for internalizing the "interesting task" mental attitude and experienced a lower degree of cognitive dissonance than did those only paid one dollar. They did not receive sufficient compensation for the lie they were asked to tell. Because of this insufficiency, the participants convinced themselves to believe that what they were doing was exciting. This way, they felt better about telling the next group of participants that it was exciting because, technically, they weren't lying.

==== Forbidden behavior paradigm ====
In the Effect of the Severity of Threat on the Devaluation of Forbidden Behavior (1963), a variant of the induced-compliance paradigm, by Elliot Aronson and Carlsmith, examined self-justification in children. Children were left in a room with toys, including a greatly desirable steam shovel, the forbidden toy. Upon leaving the room, the experimenter told one-half of the group of children that there would be severe punishment if they played with the steam-shovel toy and told the second half of the group that there would be a mild punishment for playing with the forbidden toy. All of the children refrained from playing with the forbidden toy (the steam shovel).

Later, when the children were told that they could freely play with any toy they wanted, the children in the mild-punishment group were less likely to play with the steam shovel (the forbidden toy), despite the removal of the threat of mild punishment. The children threatened with mild punishment had to justify, to themselves, why they did not play with the forbidden toy. The degree of punishment was insufficiently strong to resolve their cognitive dissonance; the children had to convince themselves that playing with the forbidden toy was not worth the effort.

In The Efficacy of Musical Emotions Provoked by Mozart's Music for the Reconciliation of Cognitive Dissonance (2012), a variant of the forbidden-toy paradigm, indicated that listening to music reduces the development of cognitive dissonance. Without music in the background, the control group of four-year-old children were told to avoid playing with a forbidden toy. After playing alone, the control-group children later devalued the importance of the forbidden toy. In the variable group, classical music played in the background while the children played alone. In the second group, the children did not later devalue the forbidden toy. The researchers, Nobuo Masataka and Leonid Perlovsky, concluded that music might inhibit cognitions that induce cognitive dissonance.

Music is a stimulus that can diminish post-decisional dissonance; in an earlier experiment, Washing Away Postdecisional Dissonance (2010), the researchers indicated that the actions of hand-washing might inhibit the cognitions that induce cognitive dissonance. That study later failed to replicate.

=== Free choice ===
In the study Post-decision Changes in Desirability of Alternatives (1956) 225 female students rated domestic appliances and then were asked to choose one of two appliances as a gift. The results of the second round of ratings indicated that the women students increased their ratings of the domestic appliance they had selected as a gift and decreased their ratings of the appliances they rejected.

This type of cognitive dissonance occurs in a person who is faced with a difficult decision and when the rejected choice may still have desirable characteristics to the chooser. The action of deciding provokes the psychological dissonance consequent to choosing X instead of Y, despite little difference between X and Y; the decision "I chose X" is dissonant with the cognition that "There are some aspects of Y that I like". The study Choice-induced Preferences in the Absence of Choice: Evidence from a Blind Two-choice Paradigm with Young Children and Capuchin Monkeys (2010) reports similar results in the occurrence of cognitive dissonance in human beings and in animals.

Peer Effects in Pro-Social Behavior: Social Norms or Social Preferences? (2013) indicated that with internal deliberation, the structuring of decisions among people can influence how a person acts. The study suggested that social preferences and social norms can explain peer effects in decision making. The study observed that choices made by the second participant would influence the first participant's effort to make choices and that inequity aversion, the preference for fairness, is the paramount concern of the participants.

=== Effort justification ===
Cognitive dissonance occurs in a person who voluntarily engages in (physically or ethically) unpleasant activities to achieve a goal. The mental stress caused by the dissonance can be reduced by the person exaggerating the desirability of the goal. In The Effect of Severity of Initiation on Liking for a Group (1956), to qualify for admission to a discussion group, two groups of people underwent an embarrassing initiation of varied psychological severity. The first group of subjects were to read aloud twelve sexual words considered obscene; the second group of subjects were to read aloud twelve sexual words not considered obscene.

Both groups were given headphones to unknowingly listen to a recorded discussion about animal sexual behaviour, which the researchers designed to be dull and banal. As the subjects of the experiment, the groups of people were told that the animal-sexuality discussion actually was occurring in the next room. The subjects whose strong initiation required reading aloud obscene words evaluated the people of their group as more-interesting persons than the people of the group who underwent the mild initiation to the discussion group.

In Washing Away Your Sins: Threatened Morality and Physical Cleansing (2006), the results indicated that a person washing their hands is an action that helps resolve post-decisional cognitive dissonance because the mental stress usually was caused by the person's ethical–moral self-disgust, which is an emotion related to the physical disgust caused by a dirty environment.

The study The Neural Basis of Rationalization: Cognitive Dissonance Reduction During Decision-making (2011) indicated that participants rated 80 names and 80 paintings based on how much they liked the names and paintings. To give meaning to the decisions, the participants were asked to select names that they might give to their children. For rating the paintings, the participants were asked to base their ratings on whether or not they would display such art at home.

The results indicated that when the decision is meaningful to the person deciding value, the likely rating is based on their attitudes (positive, neutral or negative) towards the name and towards the painting in question. The participants also were asked to rate some of the objects twice and believed that, at session's end, they would receive two of the paintings they had positively rated. The results indicated a great increase in the positive attitude of the participant towards the liked pair of things, whilst also increasing the negative attitude towards the disliked pair of things. The double-ratings of pairs of things, towards which the rating participant had a neutral attitude, showed no changes during the rating period. The existing attitudes of the participant were reinforced during the rating period and the participants experienced cognitive dissonance when confronted by a liked-name paired with a disliked-painting.

In the study, Does effort increase or decrease reward validation? Considerations from cognitive dissonance theory (2024), the authors discovered that effort justification and effort discounting may determine the amount of reward valuation a person feels after completing a task. Effort justification is the term used for high efforts leading to high rewards. Effort discounting is the term used for high efforts leading to low rewards. These terms relate to Cognitive Dissonance because humans enjoy controlling the efforts that may lead to rewards. This study determined that having high control can lead to higher efforts, leading to higher rewards. Similarly, having low control can lead to higher efforts yet lower rewards. These results indicate that humans seek highly controllable situations and actions to receive rewards for their efforts. The ability to control one's actions is crucial for eliminating the effects of Cognitive Dissonance. It is also essential in the process of decision-making without any influence, whether positive or negative, from others.

== Examples ==
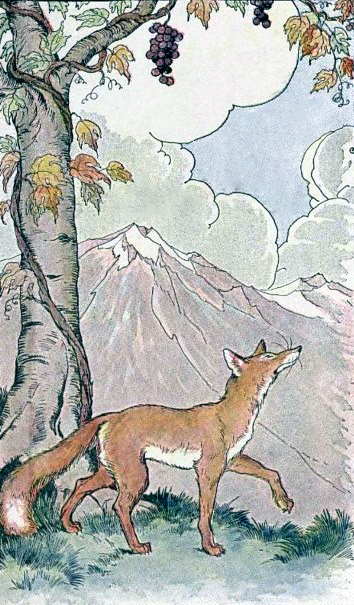
In the fable of "The Fox and the Grapes", by Aesop, on failing to reach the desired bunch of grapes, the fox then decides he does not truly want the fruit because it is sour. The fox's act of rationalization (justification) reduced his anxiety over the cognitive dissonance from the desire he cannot realise.

=== Meat-eating ===
Meat-eating can involve discrepancies between the behavior of eating meat and various ideals that the person holds. Some researchers call this form of moral conflict the meat paradox. Hank Rothgerber posited that meat eaters may encounter a conflict between their eating behavior and their affections toward animals. This occurs when the dissonant state involves recognition of one's behavior as a meat eater and a belief, attitude, or value that this behavior contradicts. The person with this state may attempt to employ various methods, including avoidance, willful ignorance, dissociation, perceived behavioral change, and do-gooder derogation to prevent this form of dissonance from occurring. Once it has occurred, they may reduce it in the form of motivated cognitions, such as denigrating animals, offering pro-meat justifications, or denying responsibility for eating meat.

The presence, or extent, of cognitive dissonance with regard to meat eating can vary depending on the attitudes and values of the individual involved because these can affect whether or not they see any moral conflict with their values and what they eat. For example, individuals who are more dominance-minded and who value having a masculine identity are less likely to experience cognitive dissonance because they are less likely to believe eating meat is morally wrong. Others cope with this cognitive dissonance through ignorance (ignoring the known realities of their food source) or explanations loosely tied to taste. The psychological phenomenon intensifies if the mind or human-like qualities of animals are explicitly mentioned.

=== Smoking ===
The study Patterns of Cognitive Dissonance-reducing Beliefs Among Smokers: A Longitudinal Analysis from the International Tobacco Control (ITC) Four Country Survey (2012) indicated that smokers use justification beliefs to reduce their cognitive dissonance about smoking tobacco and the negative consequences of smoking it.

1. Continuing smokers (Smoking and no attempt to quit since the previous round of study)
2. Successful quitters (Quit during the study and did not use tobacco from the time of the previous round of study)
3. Failed quitters (Quit during the study, but relapsed to smoking at the time of the study)

To reduce cognitive dissonance, the participant smokers adjusted their beliefs to correspond with their actions:

1. Functional beliefs ("Smoking calms me down when I am stressed or upset."; "Smoking helps me concentrate better."; "Smoking is an important part of my life."; and "Smoking makes it easier for me to socialize.")
2. Risk-minimizing beliefs ("The medical evidence that smoking is harmful is exaggerated."; "One has to die of something, so why not enjoy yourself and smoke?"; and "Smoking is no more risky than many other things people do.")

=== Littering ===
Disposing of trash outside, even when knowing this is against the law, wrong, and is harmful for the environment, is a prominent example of cognitive dissonance, especially if the person feels bad after littering but continues to do so.

Between November 2015 and March 2016, a study by Xitou Nature Education Area in Taiwan examined littering of tourists. Researchers analyzed the relationships between tourists' environmental attitudes, cognitive dissonance, and vandalism. In this study, 500 questionnaires were distributed and 499 questionnaires were returned. The results of this study indicate that older tourists had better attitudes towards the environment and cared more. The tourists who were older and cared more for outdoor activities were less likely to litter. On the other hand, the younger tourists littered more and experienced more cognitive dissonance. This study showed that younger tourists littered more as a whole and regretted or thought about it after.

A study from Kari Marie Norgaard looked at cognitive dissonance in the attitudes of Norwegians towards climate change and sustainability actions related to littering and environmental justice. According to Norgaard, these Norwegians had access to a types of dissonance that both reaffirmed order within their lives and denied any personal involvement in the matter of climate change and their responsibility to do anything about it. Some Norwegians had the privilege of "tools of order" and of "innocence" to remove themselves from their impact on their environment and assert cognitive dissonance. The study found that most of the Norwegians were engaging in this type of behavior to remove themselves from their situation.

=== Unpleasant medical screenings ===
In a study titled Cognitive Dissonance and Attitudes Toward Unpleasant Medical Screenings (2016), researchers Michael R. Ent and Mary A. Gerend informed the study participants about a discomforting test for a specific (fictitious) virus called the "human respiratory virus-27". The study used a fake virus to prevent participants from having thoughts, opinions, and feeling about the virus that would interfere with the experiment. The study participants were in two groups; one group was told that they were actual candidates for the virus-27 test, and the second group were told they were not candidates for the test. The researchers reported, "We predicted that [study] participants who thought that they were candidates for the unpleasant test would experience dissonance associated with knowing that the test was both unpleasant and in their best interest—this dissonance was predicted to result in unfavorable attitudes toward the test."

=== Religion ===
==== Homosexuality ====
In the context of religious practices, specifically those that are Christian, the idea of being a homosexual and engaging in those acts while being religious can appear to be contradictory and opposing.

Kimberly A. Mahaffy describes how this works in Cognitive Dissonance and Its Resolution: A Study of Lesbian Christians. She described many Christian women who were lesbians to also experience a firm tension because of their opposing identities. Their dissonances were found in a study to be either no dissonance (or perception thereof), internal dissonance (no one on earth can judge me, but I fear that the Creator will), and external dissonance (God is ok with me but people are not). Many people reconciled their tension by reconfiguring Biblical passages to comfort them and emphasizing the impact and expanse of God's love and acceptance.

In another study done on homosexual Christians by Martine Gross, 311 men and 84 women were polled in France to determine what their relationship with churches and religion were. Dissonance was found in those who still believed that homosexual acts were wrong according to the church and still attended church. The results found, however, that the main way to deal with this dissonance was to remove oneself from a more "traditional" church that emphasized this dissonance more and move to a less "traditional" church that was more open about accepting those that are homosexual, or at least was less flagrant about emphasizing the differences between religious idelogies and homosexual practices.

==== Religion and Jesus as God ====
In The Process of Jesus' Deification and Cognitive Dissonance Theory by Fernando Bermejo-Rubio (2017), there was found to be some cognitive dissonance in the way early Jews approached the "deification" and acceptance of Jesus as God. If early Jews were monotheistic and believed in one God, Bermejo-Rubio questioned how these Jews, especially the Nazareans, came to believe in Jesus as a deity since God was already their primary being of worship. Some cognitive dissonance had to have happened to allow them to accept two seeming Gods. If Jesus was wholly Jew and human, how did he become deified? This research claimed that much of this dissonance must have happened in the subsequent Nazarean movement after Jesus' death, not during or before.

==== Religion and evangelization ====
Evangelists may find a kind of "dissonance" when asked to become missionaries as they may be asked to present their religion in a way that does not conform to the way that they practice. In Symbolic Filtering: Selectively Permeable Evangelical Boundaries in an Age of Religious Pluralism by Jared Bok, this is examined and determined to maybe not be a kind of dissonance but rather an examination of conscious and a willingness to permeate some boundaries while ignoring others to get the message of their religion across to other cultures and do so in a way that is morally befitting to them.

==== Religion and conversion ====
Cognitive dissonance can also be found in the attitudes of those who are considering a conversion to a new religion. In Implications of Conversion and Magnitude of Cognitive Dissonance by Timothy C. Brock (1962), religious and non-religious men from Yale were polled to examine their dissonances involved in converting to Catholicism. This study was done on men who were perceived to almost be against converting due to their dissonance and it was found that a higher perception of positivity in conversion decreased this dissonance.

=== Related phenomena ===
Cognitive dissonance may also occur when people seek to explain or justify their beliefs, often without questioning the validity of their claims. After the earthquake of 1934, Bihar, India, irrational rumors based upon fear quickly reached the adjoining communities unaffected by the disaster because those people, although not in physical danger, psychologically justified their anxieties about the earthquake. The same pattern can be observed when one's convictions are met with a contradictory order. In a study conducted among 6th grade students, after being induced to cheat in an academic examination, students judged cheating less harshly. Nonetheless, the confirmation bias identifies how people readily read information that confirms their established opinions and readily avoid reading information that contradicts their opinions. The confirmation bias is apparent when a person confronts deeply held political beliefs, i.e. when a person is greatly committed to their beliefs, values, and ideas.

If a contradiction occurs between how a person feels and how a person acts, one's perceptions and emotions align to alleviate stress. The Ben Franklin effect refers to that statesman's observation that the act of performing a favor for a rival leads to increased positive feelings toward that individual. It is also possible that one's emotions be altered to minimize the regret of irrevocable choices. At a hippodrome, bettors had more confidence in their horses after the betting than before.

== Applications ==
=== Education ===
The management of cognitive dissonance readily influences the apparent motivation of a student to pursue education. The study Turning Play into Work: Effects of Adult Surveillance and Extrinsic Rewards on Children's Intrinsic Motivation (1975) indicated that the application of the effort justification paradigm increased student enthusiasm for education with the offer of an external reward for studying; students in pre-school who completed puzzles based upon an adult promise of reward were later less interested in the puzzles than were students who completed the puzzle-tasks without the promise of a reward.

The incorporation of cognitive dissonance into models of basic learning-processes to foster the students' self-awareness of psychological conflicts among their personal beliefs, ideals, and values and the reality of contradictory facts and information, requires the students to defend their personal beliefs. Afterwards, the students are trained to objectively perceive new facts and information to resolve the psychological stress of the conflict between reality and the student's value system. Moreover, educational software that applies the derived principles facilitates the students' ability to successfully handle the questions posed in a complex subject. Meta-analysis of studies indicates that psychological interventions that provoke cognitive dissonance in order to achieve a directed conceptual change do increase students' learning in reading skills and science.

=== Psychotherapy ===
The general effectiveness of psychotherapy and psychological intervention is partly explained by the theory of cognitive dissonance. In that vein, social psychology proposed that the mental health of the patient is positively influenced by his and her action in freely choosing a specific therapy and in exerting the required, therapeutic effort to overcome cognitive dissonance. That effective phenomenon was indicated in the results of the study Effects of Choice on Behavioral Treatment of Overweight Children (1983), wherein the children's belief that they freely chose the type of therapy received, resulted in each overweight child losing a greater amount of excessive body weight.

In the study Reducing Fears and Increasing Attentiveness: The Role of Dissonance Reduction (1980), people with ophidiophobia (fear of snakes) who invested much effort in activities of little therapeutic value for them (experimentally represented as legitimate and relevant) showed improved alleviation of the symptoms of their phobia. Likewise, the results of Cognitive Dissonance and Psychotherapy: The Role of Effort Justification in Inducing Weight Loss (1985) indicated that the patient felt better in justifying their efforts and therapeutic choices towards effectively losing weight. That the therapy of effort expenditure can predict long-term change in the patient's perceptions.

=== Social behavior ===
Cognitive dissonance is used to promote social behaviours considered positive, such as increased condom use. Other studies indicate that cognitive dissonance can be used to encourage people to act pro-socially, such as campaigns against public littering, campaigns against racial prejudice, and compliance with anti-speeding campaigns. The theory can also be used to explain reasons for donating to charity. Cognitive dissonance can be applied in social areas such as racism and racial hatred. Acharya of Stanford, Blackwell and Sen of Harvard state cognitive dissonance increases when an individual commits an act of violence toward someone from a different ethnic or racial group and decreases when the individual does not commit any such act of violence. Research from Acharya, Blackwell and Sen shows that individuals committing violence against members of another group develop hostile attitudes towards their victims as a way of minimizing cognitive dissonance. Importantly, the hostile attitudes may persist even after the violence itself declines (Acharya, Blackwell, and Sen, 2015). The application provides a social psychological basis for the constructivist viewpoint that ethnic and racial divisions can be socially or individually constructed, possibly from acts of violence (Fearon and Laitin, 2000). Their framework speaks to this possibility by showing how violent actions by individuals can affect individual attitudes, either ethnic or racial animosity (Acharya, Blackwell, and Sen, 2015).

=== Vicarious Dissonance and Group Identity ===
In Vicarious Dissonance: Pre-registered Meta-Analysis, we can observe that dissonance is not only found in the individual but can also impact group behavior. When a subject's personal identity is strong within a group, consistent evidence shows that if a member behaves in a way that goes against the social norm of that group, the observer can also experience dissonance vicariously. Woodward and Denton's discussion on how ego plays a role in the process aligns well with Jaubert work because the individual will still work to align themselves mentally when facing an issue that affects the group. As demonstrated by the meta-analytic results, a person may actively change their attitudes to defend the integrity of their respective groups, even if the conflict was not their fault directly. The original model proposed by Festinger can also be understood as functioning in both an individual capacity and within a group setting because people strive to return their psychological distress to manageable levels regardless.

=== COVID-19 ===
Lyu and Wehby studied the effects of wearing a face mask on the spread of COVID-19, suggesting that its use reduced COVID cases by 2%. Despite evidences and support from major health organizations, some resistance to wearing mask ensued; vaccines of COVID also faced resistance and conspiracy theories.

The Ad Council launched an extensive campaign advertising for people to follow the health guidelines established by the CDC and WHO and attempted to persuade people to become vaccinated eventually. After taking polls on public opinion about safety measures to prevent the spreading of the virus, it showed that between 80% and 90% of adults in the United States agree with these safety procedures and vaccines being necessary. The cognitive dissonance arose when people took polls on public behavior. Despite the general opinion that wearing a mask, social distancing, and receiving the vaccine are all things the public should be doing, only 50% of responders admitted to doing these things all or even most of the time. People believe that partaking in preventative measures is essential, but fail to follow through with actually doing them. To convince people to behave in line with their beliefs, it is essential to remind people of a fact that they believe is true, and then remind them of times in the past when they went against this. The hypocrisy paradigm is known for inconsistent cognition resolution through a change in behavior. Data were collected by participants that were asked to write statements supporting mask use and social distancing, which is something they agreed with. Then the participants were told to think about recent situations in which they failed to do this. The prediction was that the dissonance would be a motivating factor in getting people to be compliant with COVID-19 safety measures. After contacting participants one week later, they reported behaviors, including social distancing and mask-wearing.

=== Personal responsibility ===
A study conducted by Cooper and Worchel (1970) examined personal responsibility regarding cognitive dissonance. The goal was to investigate responsibility concerning foreseen consequences and how this might cause dissonance; 124 female participants were asked to complete problem-solving tasks while working with a partner. They had the option to either choose a partner with negative traits, or they were assigned one. A portion of the participants was aware of the negative traits their partner possessed; however, the remaining participants were unaware. Cooper hypothesized that if the participants knew about their negative partner beforehand, they would have cognitive dissonance; however, he also believed that the participants would be inclined to attempt to like their partners in an attempt to reduce this dissonance. The study shows that personal choice has the power to predict attitude changes.

=== Politics ===
Cognitive dissonance theory might suggest that since votes are an expression of preference or beliefs, even the act of voting might cause someone to defend the actions of the candidate for whom they voted.

This effect was studied over the 6 presidential elections of the United States between 1972 and 1996, and it was found that the opinion differential between the candidates changed more before and after the election than the opinion differential of non-voters. In addition, elections where the voter had a favorable attitude toward both candidates, making the choice more difficult, had the opinion differential of the candidates change more dramatically than those who only had a favorable opinion of one candidate. What was not studied were the cognitive dissonance effects in cases where the person had unfavorable attitudes toward both candidates. The 2016 U.S. election held historically high unfavorable ratings for both candidates.

After the 2020 United States presidential election, which was won by Joe Biden, supporters of former President Donald Trump, who had lost the election to Biden, questioned the outcome of the election, citing voter fraud. This continued after such claims were dismissed as false by numerous judges, election officials, U.S. state governors, and federal government agencies. This was described as an example of Trump supporters experiencing cognitive dissonance.

Electoral politics can feature more than just policy disagreements. People seek to reduce their cognitive dissonance when making any choice. Engagement in the electoral process can change policy references, drawing on the framework of cognitive dissonance theory. The idea suggests that cognitive dissonance created by being vocal about support and losing leads voters to align their preferences more closely with those of the supported candidate. Voting itself is a support activity that may led to preference changes.

Modernly, social media has affected politics. Recognizing this, creators can profit from a social media relationship between votes and candidates. For example, a celebrity endorsing a candidate can cause their followers to lose sight of policy and focus on the opinion of the person they follow, causing cognitive dissonance. Social media trends like "Kamala is Brat" have rallied fans. As a result, voters are less focused on a candidates' plans for office, and more on the social media attention stirred.

In an article from Lee D. Ross et al. titled How Christians reconcile their personal political views and the teachings of their faith: Projection as a means of dissonance reduction, political views and religion were researched in terms of dissonance. The study found that those who attended church more often were more likely to vote for a republican candidate (Bush, at the time) than a liberal counterpart. The "religion gap" refers to this phenomenon where Conservatives are deemed religious and Liberals deemed non-religious. However, the basis of this gap was found to be how central the ideologies of Christian faith were to one's identity, so the true correlation between religiosity and politics was how important each was to someone's identity. A low association with either lowered the chance for dissonance within an individual.

=== Deradicalization of extremists ===
In the context of extremism cognitive dissonance theory provides a framework for understanding both the resilience of radical beliefs and the pathways to disengagement and deradicalization. As Jonatan Kurzwelly described in a study based on interviews with former extremists, radicalized individuals frequently utilize specific coping strategies—such as adapting cognitions, altering the perceived importance of a belief, or shifting the source of discomfort—to resolve cognitive dissonance without abandoning their core extremist attitudes. However, his research indicates that cognitive dissonance can effectively catalyze deradicalization when specific criteria are met. To induce meaningful attitudinal change, the dissonance typically needs to be sustained across time and various contexts, directly threaten the individual's foundational ideological tenets and self-identity, and accumulate alongside multiple other dissonant experiences.

=== Communication ===
Cognitive dissonance theory of communication was initially advanced by American psychologist Leon Festinger in the 1960s. Festinger theorized that cognitive dissonance usually arises when a person holds two or more incompatible beliefs simultaneously. This is a normal occurrence since people encounter different situations that invoke conflicting thought sequences. This conflict results in a psychological discomfort. According to Festinger, people experiencing a thought conflict try to reduce the psychological discomfort by attempting to achieve an emotional equilibrium. This equilibrium is achieved in three main ways. First, the person may downplay the importance of the dissonant thought. Second, the person may attempt to outweigh the dissonant thought with consonant thoughts. Lastly, the person may incorporate the dissonant thought into their current belief system.

Dissonance plays an important role in persuasion. To persuade people, you must cause them to experience dissonance, and then offer your proposal as a way to resolve the discomfort. Although there is no guarantee your audience will change their minds, the theory maintains that without dissonance, there can be no persuasion. Without a feeling of discomfort, people are not motivated to change. Similarly, it is the feeling of discomfort which motivates people to perform selective exposure (i.e., avoiding disconfirming information) as a dissonance-reduction strategy.

Dissonance also plays an essential role in social collaboration. In the study, Temporal interplay between cognitive conflict and attentional markers in social collaboration (2024), the authors determined that the context in social environments and demands affect one's willingness to collaborate socially. Some social interactions require the ability to read social cues and body language, and others do not. The authors used robots to simulate different social interactions. They discovered that the human brain is designed to deal with the possible complex aspects of social collaboration. They also found that the brain will change its reaction to these aspects depending on the type of interaction the person faces. To summarize, Dissonance can affect how the brain reacts to specific social cues and interactions by making it difficult to differentiate between types of interactions. Dissonance can also make it difficult to collaborate socially with others.

Zhang and Pan have taken a modern approach that examined cognitive dissonance through the lens of digital media by deciding to focus on the effects of multiple information sources and the addictive nature of constant exposure to that environment. The results of their experiment produced data that improved the researchers' ability to predict when a subject would quit the digital platform due to the compounding stress from dissonance caused by poor media practices or information overload. They also determined that the negative consequences from the subject's behavior were reduced in those who believed they had more control over their own thoughts and actions.

=== Artificial intelligence ===
It is hypothesized that introducing cognitive dissonance into machine learning may be able to assist in the long-term aim of developing 'creative autonomy' on the part of agents, including in multi-agent systems (such as games), and ultimately to the development of 'strong' forms of artificial intelligence, including artificial general intelligence.

Artificial intelligence has developed over the years and is used for writing, generating ideas, and generating art, among other things. Artificial intelligence is most commonly used in education. AI-driven education can contribute to cognitive dissonance. For example, as a result of a negative output from AI, it may create a system that is inconsistent with a student's self-concepts, past knowledge or expectations.

Generative AI tools are already taking a forefront in education. With students using artificial intelligence for daily tasks, it is important that educators understand what this might mean for higher education practice. Students can be reluctant to have open conversation about their use of AI, making it difficult for educators to understand its effects on students in that environment. Because professors and other educators say one thing, and the AI application generates another, it causes students to develop a sense of cognitive dissonance.

=== Feminism ===
Cognitive Dissonance Theory can be applied to many aspects of feminism. For instance, the study, Dissonance and defensiveness: orienting affects in online feminist cultures (2024), found that social media culture provides conflicting ideas and thoughts of femininity. These thoughts and ideas may confuse those who identify with feminist qualities. The digital world can connect people from around the globe, but it can also spread hatred and falsifications about feminists and their beliefs. Cognitive Dissonance can pressure feminists through their education, interactions, and relationships with others.

== Related theories and ideas ==
=== Self-Regulation ===
Self-regulation describes the process of an environment acting upon an individual and an individual acting out because of this. If an environment or situation makes a person want to act in a certain way, and societally it is right to do so, but the person does not do this, this results in cognitive dissonance where the person will try to rationalize this line of thinking with their greater environment. Self-regulation can describe all forms of acting, from psychological norms to behavioral norms and even thought processes. In Positive Development in Adolescence: The Development and Role of Intentional Self-Regulation from Gestsdottir and Lerner (2008), self-regulation is also described as a way to adapt behavior, cognitively and physically, to adjust to social norms.

Self-regulation can be distinguished in two ways: intentional and organismic. Intentional means one is conscious of their decisions and creates a plan to adjust their behavior. Organismic regulation is biological change related to one's own internal regulations that are not consciously controlled by a person, such as a response or regulation to the environment in the form of body temperature. Self-regulation as it relates to cognitive dissonance will be intentional self-regulation as this dissonance does not happen at the unconscious level of base, hormonally-controlled regulations in the body.

Much of self-regulation is formed in the developmental periods of childhood and adolescence as the frontal cortex develops and grows. Responses to the environment and how information is processed is determined by how those around us also react, and self-regulation can be changed and formed as one is shaped by the years of their life. Thus, self-regulation could be considered a non-linear path of growth and can flux and change as one grows. The delay of gratification is one such example of self-regulation that can be used in developmental years, where one denies themself gratification or stimulus from an object of desire until a planned time, not immediately, to learn control.

=== Moral Disengagement Theory ===
Cognitive Dissonance is also related to the theory of Moral Disengagement, where one removes their cognition from their normal moral reasoning to justify an action. This is a self-engaged form of disengagement, where one applies this dissonance from morality to their own actions, not to their actions to others or their judgements of others' actions. This theory is closely related to Self-Regulation Theory, mentioned above.

Personal standards, such as the way one wants to live life, and moral standards, such as the way one is habituated to live life, dictate this theory. Cognitive dissonance is essential to this because while one may want to act a certain way, it can be halted by one's surroundings and means of obtaining this act, resulting in a guilty conscious and the need to engage in moral disengagement. Cognitive dissonance is the act of justifying an action that does not correlate to one's normal ways of thinking; in turn, moral disengagement is an act of cognitive dissonance where one acts immorally and justifies it cognitively to reassert their moral norms and means.

Moral disengagement involves significant guilt, especially pre-guilt before morally disengaging, distinguishing it from cognitive dissonance. Cognitive dissonance uses moral reasoning to justify the ends to the means, but moral disengagement involves a complete removal from all moral reasoning, instituting a new kind of reasoning to justify actions.

Much of moral disengagement revolves around self-interest and self-motivated actions. These motives can result in ethical immoralities. In Situational Moral Disengagement: Can the Effects of Self-Interest be Mitigated? from Kish-Gephart et al. (2014), the researchers claim that moral disengagement is enacted when the opportunity for gain for oneself is clearly evident and persuasive. This research also relates moral disengagement to a lack of self-regulatory processes, described as social standards that dictate and align one's actions.

== Alternative paradigms ==
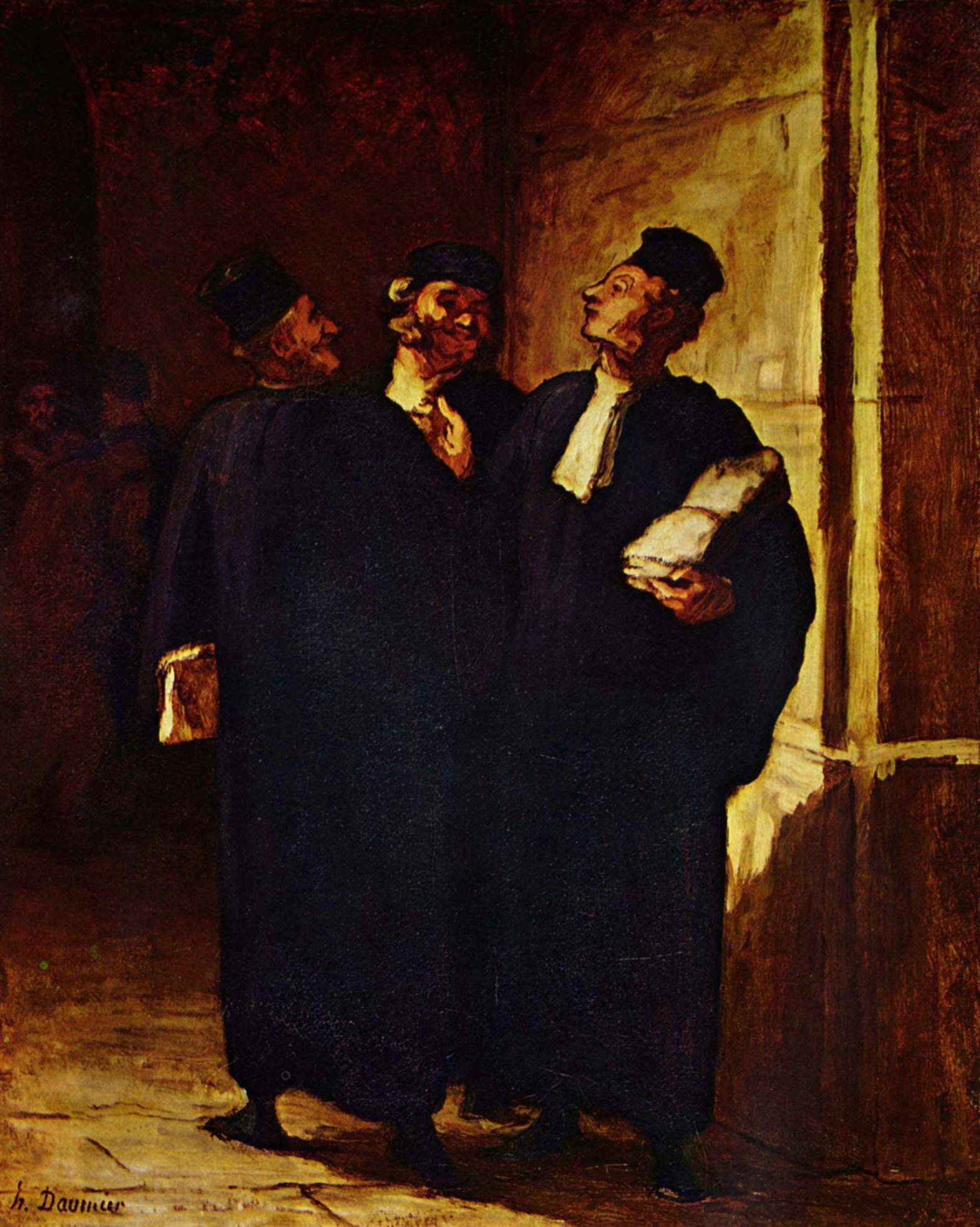
Dissonant self-perception: A lawyer can experience cognitive dissonance if he must defend as innocent a client he thinks is guilty. From the perspective of The Theory of Cognitive Dissonance: A Current Perspective (1969), the lawyer might experience cognitive dissonance if his false statement about his guilty client contradicts his identity as a lawyer and an honest man.

=== Self-perception theory ===
In Self-perception: An alternative interpretation of cognitive dissonance phenomena (1967), the social psychologist Daryl Bem proposed the self-perception theory whereby people do not think much about their attitudes, even when engaged in a conflict with another person. The Theory of Self-perception proposes that people develop attitudes by observing their own behaviour, and concludes that their attitudes caused the behaviour observed by self-perception; especially true when internal cues either are ambiguous or weak. Therefore, the person is in the same position as an observer who must rely upon external cues to infer their inner state of mind. Self-perception theory proposes that people adopt attitudes without access to their states of mood and cognition.

As such, the experimental subjects of the Festinger and Carlsmith study (Cognitive Consequences of Forced Compliance, 1959) inferred their mental attitudes from their own behaviour. When the subject-participants were asked: "Did you find the task interesting?", the participants decided that they must have found the task interesting, because that is what they told the questioner. Their replies suggested that the participants who were paid twenty dollars had an external incentive to adopt that positive attitude, and likely perceived the twenty dollars as the reason for saying the task was interesting, rather than saying the task actually was interesting.

The theory of self-perception (Bem) and the theory of cognitive dissonance (Festinger) make identical predictions, but only the theory of cognitive dissonance predicts the presence of unpleasant arousal, of psychological distress, which were verified in laboratory experiments.

In The Theory of Cognitive Dissonance: A Current Perspective (Aronson, Berkowitz, 1969), Elliot Aronson linked cognitive dissonance to the self-concept: That mental stress arises when the conflicts among cognitions threatens the person's positive self-image. This reinterpretation of the original Festinger and Carlsmith study, using the induced-compliance paradigm, proposed that the dissonance was between the cognitions "I am an honest person." and "I lied about finding the task interesting."

The study Cognitive Dissonance: Private Ratiocination or Public Spectacle? (Tedeschi, Schlenker, etc. 1971) reported that maintaining cognitive consistency, rather than protecting a private self-concept, is how a person protects their public self-image. Moreover, the results reported in the study I'm No Longer Torn After Choice: How Explicit Choices Implicitly Shape Preferences of Odors (2010) contradict such an explanation, by showing the occurrence of revaluation of material items, after the person chose and decided, even after having forgotten the choice.

=== Balance theory ===
Fritz Heider proposed a motivational theory of attitudinal change that derives from the idea that humans are driven to establish and maintain psychological balance. The driving force for this balance is known as the consistency motive, which is an urge to maintain one's values and beliefs consistent over time. Heider's conception of psychological balance has been used in theoretical models measuring cognitive dissonance.

According to balance theory, there are three interacting elements: (1) the self (P), (2) another person (O), and (3) an element (X). These are each positioned at one vertex of a triangle and share two relations:

Unit relations – things and people that belong together based on similarity, proximity, fate, etc.
Sentiment relations – evaluations of people and things (liking, disliking)

Under balance theory, human beings seek a balanced state of relations among the three positions. This can take the form of three positives or two negatives and one positive:

P = you
O = your child
X = picture your child drew

"I love my child"
"She drew me this picture"
"I love this picture"

People also avoid unbalanced states of relations, such as three negatives or two positives and one negative:

P = you
O = John
X = John's dog

"I don't like John"
"John has a dog"
"I don't like the dog either"

=== Cost–benefit analysis ===
In the study On the Measurement of the Utility of Public Works (1969), Jules Dupuit reported that behaviors and cognitions can be understood from an economic perspective, wherein people engage in the systematic process of comparing the costs and benefits of a decision. The psychological process of cost-benefit comparisons helps the person to assess and justify the feasibility (spending money) of an economic decision, and is the basis for determining if the benefit outweighs the cost, and to what extent. Moreover, although the method of cost-benefit analysis functions in economic circumstances, men and women remain psychologically inefficient at comparing the costs against the benefits of their economic decision.

=== Self-discrepancy theory ===
E. Tory Higgins proposed that people have three selves, to which they compare themselves:

1. Actual self – representation of the attributes the person believes themself to possess (basic self-concept)
2. Ideal self – ideal attributes the person would like to possess (hopes, aspiration, motivations to change)
3. Ought self – ideal attributes the person believes they should possess (duties, obligations, responsibilities)

When these self-guides are contradictory psychological distress (cognitive dissonance) results. People are motivated to reduce self-discrepancy (the gap between two self-guides).

=== Averse consequences vs. inconsistency ===
In the 1980s, Cooper and Fazio argued that dissonance was caused by aversive consequences, rather than inconsistency. According to this interpretation, the belief that lying is wrong and hurtful, not the inconsistency between cognitions, is what makes people feel bad. Subsequent research, however, found that people experience dissonance even when they believe they have not done anything wrong. For example, Harmon-Jones and colleagues showed that people experience dissonance even when the consequences of their statements are beneficial—as when they convince sexually active students to use condoms, when they, themselves are not using condoms.

=== Criticism of the free-choice paradigm ===
In the study How Choice Affects and Reflects Preferences: Revisiting the Free-choice Paradigm (Chen, Risen, 2010) the researchers criticized the free-choice paradigm as invalid, because the rank-choice-rank method is inaccurate for the study of cognitive dissonance. That the designing of research-models relies upon the assumption that, if the experimental subject rates options differently in the second survey, then the attitudes of the subject towards the options have changed. That there are other reasons why an experimental subject might achieve different rankings in the second survey; perhaps the subjects were indifferent between choices.

Although the results of some follow-up studies (e.g. Do Choices Affect Preferences? Some Doubts and New Evidence, 2013) presented evidence of the unreliability of the rank-choice-rank method, the results of studies such as Neural Correlates of Cognitive Dissonance and Choice-induced Preference Change (2010) have not found the Choice-Rank-Choice method to be invalid, and indicate that making a choice can change the preferences of a person.

=== Action–motivation model ===
Festinger's original theory did not seek to explain how dissonance works. Why is inconsistency so aversive? The action–motivation model seeks to answer this question. It proposes that inconsistencies in a person's cognition cause mental stress because psychological inconsistency interferes with the person's functioning in the real world. Among techniques for coping, the person may choose to exercise a behavior that is inconsistent with their current attitude (a belief, an ideal, a value system), but later try to alter that belief to make it consistent with a current behavior; the cognitive dissonance occurs when the person's cognition does not match the action taken. If the person changes the current attitude, after the dissonance occurs, they are then obligated to commit to that course of behavior.

Cognitive dissonance produces a state of negative affect, which motivates the person to reconsider the causative behavior in order to resolve the psychological inconsistency that caused the mental stress. As the affected person works towards a behavioral commitment, the motivational process then is activated in the left frontal cortex of the brain.

=== Predictive dissonance model ===
The predictive dissonance model proposes that cognitive dissonance is fundamentally related to the predictive coding (or predictive processing) model of cognition. A predictive processing account of the mind proposes that perception actively involves the use of a Bayesian hierarchy of acquired prior knowledge, which primarily serves the role of predicting incoming proprioceptive, interoceptive and exteroceptive sensory inputs. Therefore, the brain is an inference machine that attempts to actively predict and explain its sensations. Crucial to this inference is the minimization of prediction error. The predictive dissonance account proposes that the motivation for cognitive dissonance reduction is related to an organism's active drive for reducing prediction error. Moreover, it proposes that human (and perhaps other animal) brains have evolved to selectively ignore contradictory information (as proposed by dissonance theory) to prevent the overfitting of their predictive cognitive models to local and thus non-generalizing conditions. The predictive dissonance account is highly compatible with the action-motivation model since, in practice, prediction error can arise from unsuccessful behavior.

== Neuroscience findings ==
Technological advances are allowing psychologists to study the biomechanics of cognitive dissonance.

=== Visualization ===
The study Neural Activity Predicts Attitude Change in Cognitive Dissonance (Van Veen, Krug, etc., 2009) identified the neural bases of cognitive dissonance with functional magnetic resonance imaging (fMRI); the neural scans of the participants replicated the basic findings of the induced-compliance paradigm. When in the fMRI scanner, some of the study participants argued that the uncomfortable, mechanical environment of the MRI machine nevertheless was a pleasant experience for them; some participants, from an experimental group, said they enjoyed the mechanical environment of the fMRI scanner more than did the control-group participants (paid actors) who argued about the uncomfortable experimental environment.

The results of the neural scan experiment support the original theory of Cognitive Dissonance proposed by Festinger in 1957; and also support the psychological conflict theory, whereby the anterior cingulate functions, in counter-attitudinal response, to activate the dorsal anterior cingulate cortex and the anterior insular cortex; the degree of activation of said regions of the brain is predicted by the degree of change in the psychological attitude of the person.

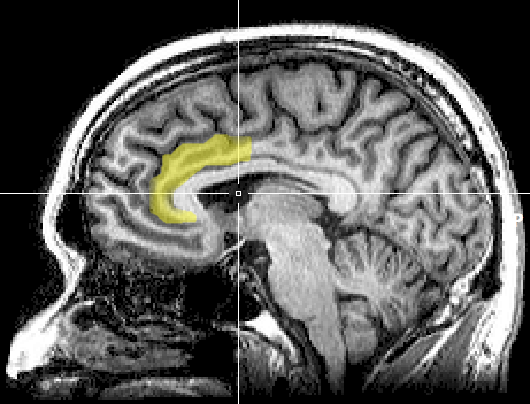
The biomechanics of cognitive dissonance: MRI evidence indicates that the greater the psychological conflict signalled by the anterior cingulate cortex, the greater the magnitude of the cognitive dissonance experienced by the person.

As an application of the free-choice paradigm, the study How Choice Reveals and Shapes Expected Hedonic Outcome (2009) indicates that after making a choice, neural activity in the striatum changes to reflect the person's new evaluation of the choice-object; neural activity increased if the object was chosen, neural activity decreased if the object was rejected. Moreover, studies such as The Neural Basis of Rationalization: Cognitive Dissonance Reduction During Decision-making (2010) and How Choice Modifies Preference: Neural Correlates of Choice Justification (2011) confirm the neural bases of the psychology of cognitive dissonance.

The Neural Basis of Rationalization: Cognitive Dissonance Reduction During Decision-making (Jarcho, Berkman, Lieberman, 2010) applied the free-choice paradigm to fMRI examination of the brain's decision-making process whilst the study participant actively tried to reduce cognitive dissonance. The results indicated that the active reduction of psychological dissonance increased neural activity in the right-inferior frontal gyrus, in the medial fronto-parietal region, and in the ventral striatum, and that neural activity decreased in the anterior insula. That the neural activities of rationalization occur in seconds, without conscious deliberation on the part of the person; and that the brain engages in emotional responses whilst effecting decisions.

=== Emotional correlations ===
The results reported in Contributions from Research on Anger and Cognitive Dissonance to Understanding the Motivational Functions of Asymmetrical Frontal Brain Activity (Harmon-Jones, 2004) indicate that the occurrence of cognitive dissonance is associated with neural activity in the left frontal cortex, a brain structure also associated with the emotion of anger; moreover, functionally, anger motivates neural activity in the left frontal cortex. Applying a directional model of Approach motivation, the study Anger and the Behavioural Approach System (2003) indicated that the relationship between cognitive dissonance and anger is supported by neural activity in the left frontal cortex that occurs when a person takes control of the social situation causing the cognitive dissonance. Conversely, if the person cannot control or cannot change the psychologically stressful stimulation, they are without a motivation to change the circumstance, then there arise other, negative emotions to manage the cognitive dissonance, such as socially inappropriate behavior.

The anterior cingulate cortex activity increases when errors occur and are being monitored as well as having behavioral conflicts with the self-concept as a form of higher-level thinking. A study was done to test the prediction that the left frontal cortex would have increased activity. University students had to write a paper depending on if they were assigned to a high-choice or low-choice condition. The low-choice condition required students to write about supporting a 10% increase in tuition at their university. The high-choice condition asked students to write in favor of tuition increase as if it were their completely voluntary choice. The researchers use EEG to analyze students before they wrote the essay, as dissonance is at its highest during this time (Beauvois and Joule, 1996). High-choice condition participants showed a higher level of the left frontal cortex than the low-choice participants. Results show that the initial experience of dissonance can be apparent in the anterior cingulate cortex, then the left frontal cortex is activated, which also activates the approach motivational system to reduce anger.

=== The psychology of mental stress ===
The results reported in The Origins of Cognitive Dissonance: Evidence from Children and Monkeys (Egan, Santos, Bloom, 2007) indicated that there might be evolutionary force behind the reduction of cognitive dissonance in the actions of pre-school-age children and Capuchin monkeys when offered a choice between two like options, decals and candies. The groups then were offered a new choice, between the choice-object not chosen and a novel choice-object that was as attractive as the first object. The resulting choices of the human and simian subjects concorded with the theory of cognitive dissonance when the children and the monkeys each chose the novel choice-object instead of the choice-object not chosen in the first selection, despite every object having the same value.

The hypothesis of An Action-based Model of Cognitive-dissonance Processes (Harmon-Jones, Levy, 2015) proposed that psychological dissonance occurs consequent to the stimulation of thoughts that interfere with a goal-driven behavior. Researchers mapped the neural activity of the participant when performing tasks that provoked psychological stress when engaged in contradictory behaviors. A participant read aloud the printed name of a color. To test for the occurrence of cognitive dissonance, the name of the color was printed in a color different from the word read aloud by the participant. As a result, the participants experienced increased neural activity in the anterior cingulate cortex when the experimental exercises provoked psychological dissonance.

The study Cognitive Neuroscience of Social Emotions and Implications for Psychopathology: Examining Embarrassment, Guilt, Envy, and Schadenfreude (Jankowski, Takahashi, 2014) identified neural correlations to specific social emotions (e.g. envy and embarrassment) as a measure of cognitive dissonance. The neural activity for the emotion of Envy (the feeling of displeasure at the good fortune of another person) was found to draw neural activity from the dorsal anterior cingulate cortex. That such increased activity in the dorsal anterior cingulate cortex occurred either when a person's self-concept was threatened or when the person experienced embarrassment (social pain) caused by salient, upward social-comparison, by social-class snobbery. That social emotions, such as embarrassment, guilt, envy, and Schadenfreude (joy at the misfortune of another person) are correlated to reduced activity in the insular lobe, and with increased activity in the striate nucleus; those neural activities are associated with a reduced sense of empathy (social responsibility) and an increased propensity towards antisocial behavior (delinquency).

=== Body image and health intervention ===
Some school programs discuss body image and eating disorders of children and adolescents. Disordered eating behaviors include binge eating episodes, excessive fasting, vomiting, and diet pills. National data from 2017 and 2018 highlights that since starting college, approximately 50 percent of college students reported becoming increasingly concerned with their weight and body shape. Studies examining eating disorders (ED) symptoms in college students reported that only 20 percent of those with positive ED got help. Less than 10 percent were diagnosed with an ED. This Body Project (BP) is rooted in the theory of cognitive dissonance. Cognitive dissonance occurs when a discrepancy emerges between beliefs and actions. The idea is centered around the notion that if beliefs and actions are inconsistent, then the individual will create a change to align the beliefs and actions. The BP uses cognitive dissonance to target ED, for example, social pressure from peers or not being satisfied with your appearance, to bring awareness and for a healthy and positive change, thoughts toward body image.

=== Modeling in neural networks ===
Artificial neural network models of cognition provide methods for integrating the results of empirical research about cognitive dissonance and attitudes into a single model that explains the formation of psychological attitudes and the mechanisms to change such attitudes. Among the artificial neural-network models that predict how cognitive dissonance might influence a person's attitudes and behavior, are:

- Parallel constraint satisfaction processes
- The meta-cognitive model (MCM) of attitudes
- Adaptive connectionist model of cognitive dissonance
- Attitudes as constraint satisfaction model

=== Consumer behavior ===
Pleasure is one of the main factors in our modern culture of consumerism. Once a consumer has chosen to purchase a specific item, they often fear that another choice may have brought them more pleasure. Post-purchase dissonance occurs when a purchase is final, voluntary, and significant to the person. This dissonance is a mental discomfort arising from the possibility of dissatisfaction with the purchase, or the regret of not purchasing a different, potentially more useful or satisfactory good. Consequently, the buyer will "seek to reduce dissonance by increasing the perceived attractiveness of the chosen alternative and devaluing the non chosen item, seeking out information to confirm the decision, or changing attitudes to conform to the decision." In other words, the buyer justifies their purchase to themselves in whatever way they can, in an attempt to convince themselves that they made the right decision and to diminish regret. Usually these feelings of regret are more prevalent after online purchases as opposed to in-store purchases. This happens because an online consumer does not have the opportunity to experience the product in its entirety, and must rely on what information is available through photos and descriptions. On the other hand, in-store shopping can sometimes be even more of an issue for consumers in regard to impulse buying. While the ease of online shopping proves hard to resist for impulse buyers, in-store shoppers may be influenced by who they are with. Shopping with friends increases the risk of impulse buying, especially compared to shopping with people such as one's parents.

Post-purchase dissonance does not only affect the consumer; brands are dependent on customer loyalty, and cognitive dissonance can influence that loyalty. The more positive experiences and emotions that a customer associates with a specific brand, the more likely they are to buy from that brand in the future, recommend it to friends, etc. The opposite is also true, meaning any feelings of discomfort, dissatisfaction, and regret will weaken the consumer's perception of the brand and make them less likely to return as a customer. When consumers encounter unexpected prices, they adopt three methods to reduce cognitive dissonance: (i) Employ a strategy of continual information; (ii) Employ a change in attitude; and (iii) Engage in minimisation. Consumers employ the strategy of continual information by engaging in bias and searching for information that supports prior beliefs. Consumers might search for information about other retailers and substitute products consistent with their beliefs. Alternatively, consumers might change attitude, such as re-evaluating price in relation to external reference-prices or associating high prices and low prices with quality. Minimisation reduces the importance of the elements of the dissonance; consumers tend to minimise the importance of money, and thus of shopping around, saving, and finding a better deal. High impulse buying is associated with increased post-purchase cognitive dissonance, where consumers experience discomfort and regret after purchasing.

=== Psychophysiological Evidence ===
The psychophysiological Correlates of Cognitive Dissonance and other recent studies have shifted focus to observing cognitive dissonance in a biological context. While in a state of forced dissonance set up by their experiment, researchers reported significant changes in the subjects' electrodermal and cardiovascular activity. Researchers reported changes in electrodermal and cardiovascular activity during induced cognitive dissonance.

By combining the psychophysiological findings, evidence from meta-analytic research, and studies on the effects from digital media, the data can be evaluated alongside Festinger's theory of cognitive dissonance, which already serves as a framework being used to explain different patterns in human behavior. Cognitive dissonance theory research expands to biology, social behavior, and more modern technological environments.

== See also ==
- Ambiguity tolerance–intolerance: how individuals respond to ambiguous stimuli
- Choice-supportive bias
- Cognitive bias
- Cultural dissonance
- Wishful thinking
