= Female bonding =

Close personal relationship between women

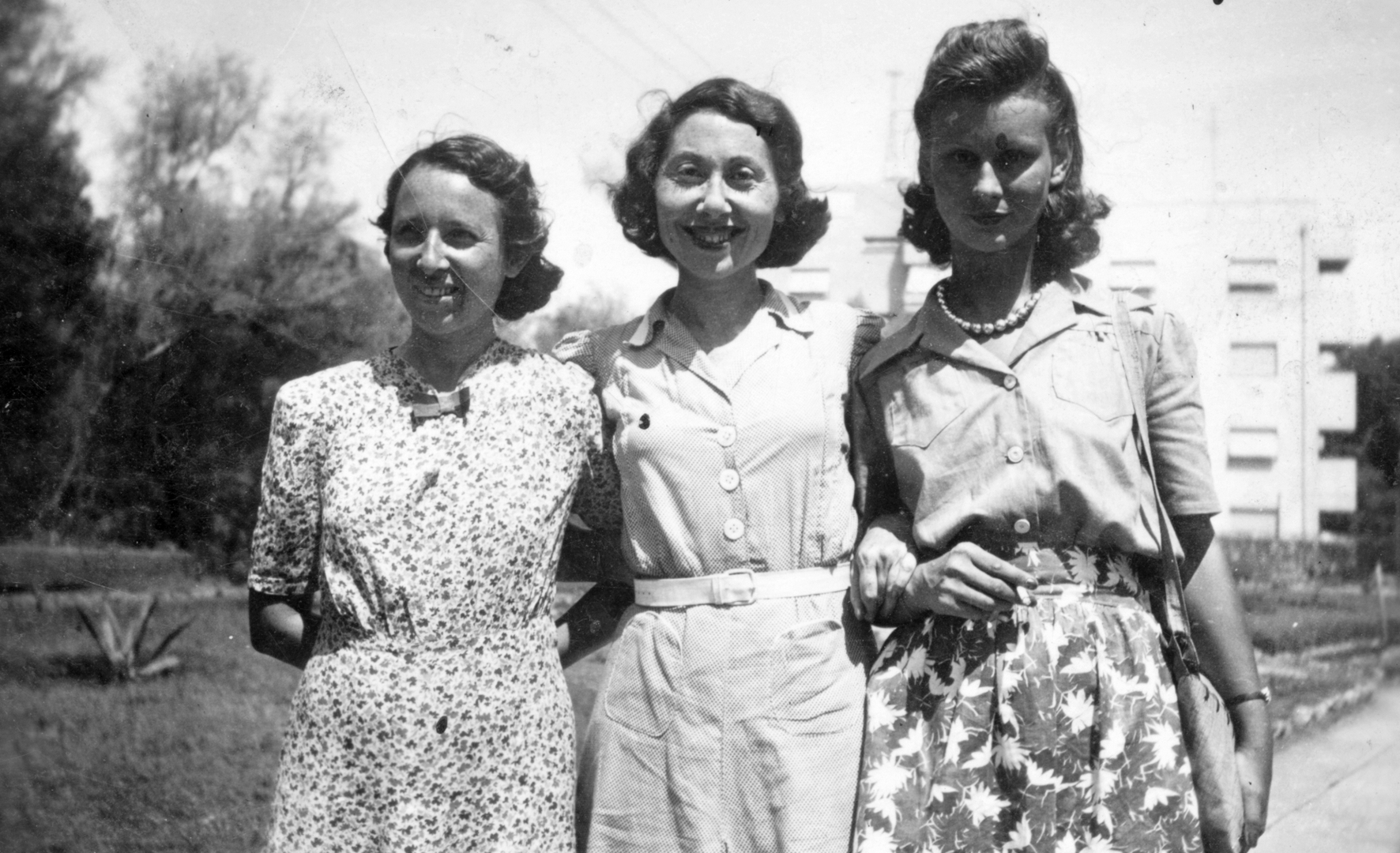
Women in 1940s, Tel-Aviv

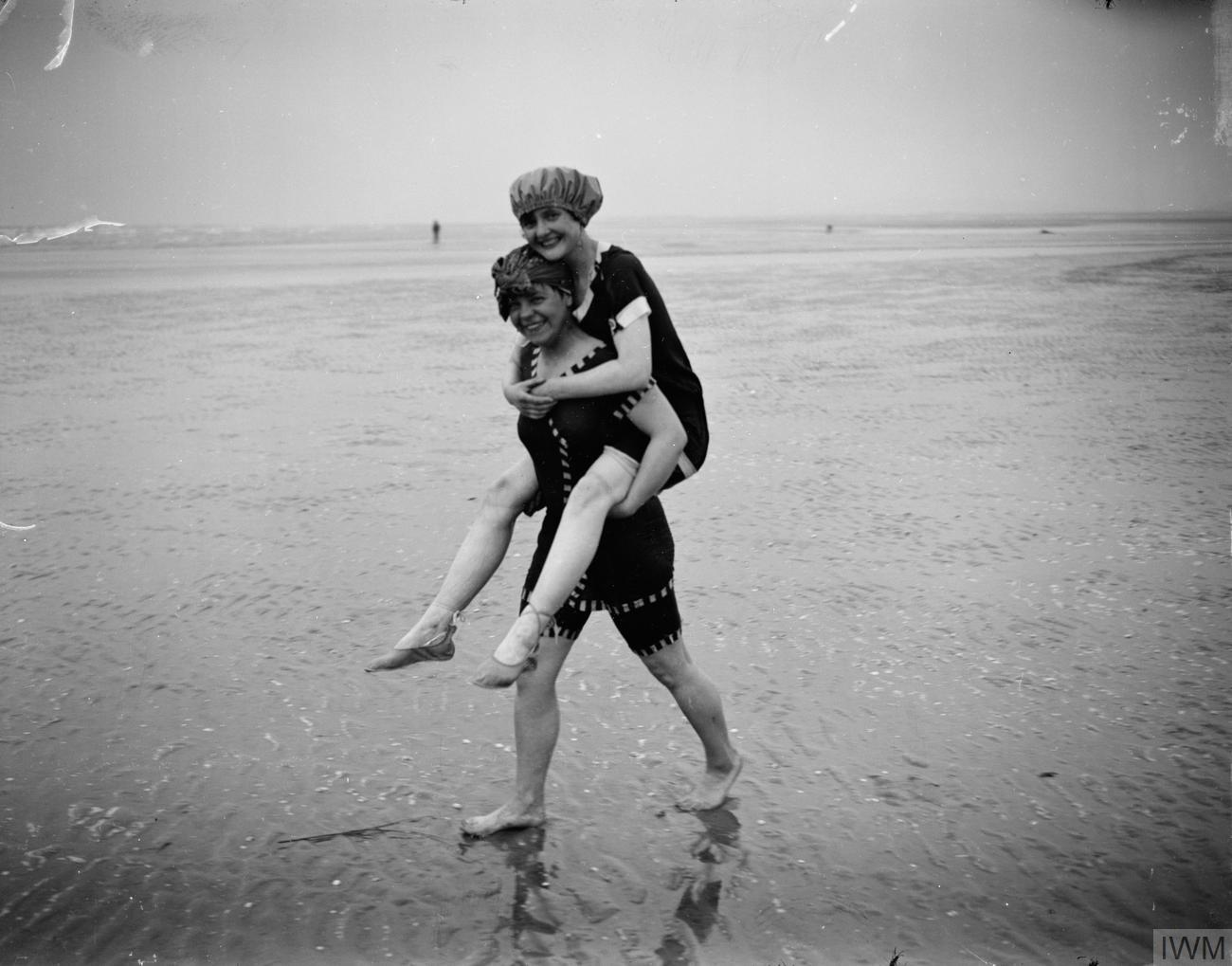
Two friends at the beach, 1918

In ethology and social science, female bonding is the formation of a close personal relationship and patterns of friendship, attachment, and cooperation between females.

== Examples ==
Female bonding can be further explored within the human context of relationships within the family. For example, the positive mother-daughter ties which develop have been described to provide immense emotional, financial and instrumental support; indicating that female bonding is present. In an alternative study, a mother described her daughters as "more like sisters, communicating that equality...was an essential feature of their current relationships. They used the language of companionate ties..."

In addition to mother-daughter ties, sibling ties can be carefully examined for further exemplification in female bonding. There is much evidence that sister-sister ties are the strongest ties that exist, out of the possible combinations of gendered sibling ties which are shared. In a recent study, an interviewee described her relationship shared with her sister as the most enduring and intimate of her life. This further suggests the emotional sharing which is said to be the primary foundation on which female bonding is founded.

There has also been evidence within animal context regarding the genetic theory behind female bonding. A study that "investigated the social network structure of an embayment population of Indo-Pacific bottlenose dolphins, Tursiops aduncus, ... examined the impact of sex...in maintaining the cohesion of the social network." The results of this article prove that there was "greater influence on female[s] than on male social relationships, as association strength was positively correlated with genetic relatedness between females".

== See also ==
- Affectional orientation
- Cross-sex friendship
- Female buddy film
- Feminine psychology
- Homosociality
- Human bonding
- Lesbian
- Male bonding
- Social connection
- Sex differences in psychology
- Womance
- Laotong – Type of relationship between women found in Chinese culture
