= Same-sex intimacy =

Same-sex intimacy, also known as same-gender intimacy, refers to a close emotional, physical, sensual, or sexual relationship between people of the same sex or gender. While often associated with romantic and sexual relationships, intimacy also encompasses strong non-sexual and non-romantic relationships.

== In history ==
Many historical figures are believed to have had intimate same-sex relationships. This includes but is not limited to Alexander the Great, Oscar Wilde, and Emily Dickinson, all of whom are documented to have had intimate same-sex relationships.

=== Alexander the Great ===
The topic of Alexander the Great's sexuality has been highly debated, particularly surrounding his relationship with his close friend, general, and confidant Hephaestion. Their friendship began when they were children studying under Aristotle and continued throughout their lives until Hephaestion's death. Aristotle described Alexander and Hephaestion as one soul abiding in two bodies. Scholar William Woodthrope wrote in his work Alexander the Great: Sources and studies that "There is then not one scrap of evidence for calling Alexander homosexual." Another scholar Athena Richardson argues that not only does the historical record support the assertion that Alexander may have been bisexual, but also that "Ancient biographers may have conducted censorship to conceal any implication of femininity or submissiveness in Alexander that this relationship dynamic might suggest. As a result, subsequent cultures would have hidden the relationship too."

=== Oscar Wilde ===
Oscar Wilde had heavily documented same-sex romantic and sexual relationships, mostly through the extensive legal documentation from the multiple trials accusing him of the crime of sodomy. According to biographer Richard Ellmann's account, Wilde met a young man named Robert Ross at Oxford who was "so young and yet so knowing, was determined to seduce Wilde." The evidence produced in these trials documented in detail the same-sex intimate relationships Wilde had. The first trial, Wilde v Queensbury, resulted from the Marguess of Queensberry leaving a note at a club Wilde frequented publicly calling him a sodomite, resulting in Wilde accusing Queensberry of libel. The trial revealed that Wilde had been giving gifts to men and boys as young as 16 and the prosecution had allegedly located several male prostitutes willing to testify they had has sex with Wilde. At the advice of his legal counsel, he dropped the case and declared bankruptcy. he second trial, Regina v Wilde, immediately followed the first trial. Wilde was formally arrested and charged with sodomy, found guilty, and served just under 2 years in jail.

=== Emily Dickinson ===
The poet Emily Dickinson has been well documented to have expressed desires for same-sex intimacy through her letters to her sister-in-law Susan Huntington Gilbert Dickinson, which were revealed by a 1998 study to have been deliberately censored to remove Gilbert's name. In these letters, Dickinson expresses feelings of immense desire for Gilbert, stating in one of them, "I hope for you so much and feel so eager for you, feel that I cannot wait, feel that now I must have you—that the expectation once more to see your face again, makes me feel hot and feverish, and my heart beats so fast."

== In romantic or sexual relationships ==
=== In gay male relationships ===
In the view of psychological discourse in the Western world, men who are cisgender on average are more likely to prefer the maintenance of boundaries in romantic relationships with the mutual respect of said boundaries being seen as a vehicle for expression of love. Gay men on average place less importance on sex as an act of emotional intimacy, with importance being placed on average more on the physical aspect. When same-sex partners develop a romantic relationship these tendencies can lead to a psychologically more fulfilling and satisfying relationship. Gay men in partnerships on average place less importance on emotion work than do cisgendered female partnerships. Instead, focusing on maintaining distance and avoiding crossing potential boundaries by expressing emotional needs, and are more likely to keep their problems to themselves.

Gay male partnership had the tendency to uphold masculine relational patterns by maintaining boundaries and autonomy but many partners managed to provide emotional support to their partners when required. People who experience same-sex attraction often deal with the issue of internalised homophobia. Within the intimate aspect of their relationships, this can manifest in shame or feelings of self disgust but couples often worked through such feelings together which strengthened intimacy comfort in the relationship.

=== In lesbian relationships ===
According to Western psychological discourse cisgender women tend to prefer the breakdown of boundaries as a form of closeness between partners. In romantic relationships women tend to prefer sexual intimacy as a method to bring partners closer. Women in lesbian relationships on average also used sex as a way to differentiate the romantic relationship from friendship. Women on average also have the tendency to place more emphasis on the role of emotion work in a relationship, this is defined as effort to improve the emotional state of your partner. This also includes the tendency to ask for support which is on average more common in women. Lesbian partnerships on average display the highest rate of emotion work compared to straight relationships. Women in lesbian relationships on average have the tendency to maintain gendered norms by doing large amounts of emotion work, ultimately however both partners tend to do a large amount of emotion work leading to a more equal input than in partnerships with cisgendered men.

== In platonic relationships ==
=== In male same-sex relationships ===
From the view point of Western research on male cisgendered friendships are more likely to be casual and club-like, whereas cisgender men spend time in rigid groups that often focus on activities like sports or video games. Men are more likely to affiliate with a club as opposed to specific individuals. Men are likely to keep one close platonic friendship at a time. Men's closer social circles tend to look like a wheel with a central individual who acts as catalyst to others' connections. With each individual on average interacting equally both during and outside of gatherings.

Men have a tendency to take part in less intimacy and self disclosure than do women and instead maintain connections using activity. But as men age they are more likely to have what they consider a "BFF" (best friend forever).

There is some evidence however for shifting social norms between young college enrolled men. Where as in the past research showed that male platonic relationships were policed by homophobia. Since the turn of the millennium in Britain and United States there has been a shift to more tactile affection such as hugging, cuddling and sometimes kissing. There has also been a noted increase in emotional intimacy apparent through candid interpersonal conversation. Men today in this population have a higher likelihood of having bromances, and maintaining their bromances beyond college; even bringing their closeness to other friendships made after college.

=== In female same-sex relationships ===
In a psychological study on western friendships between cisgendered women, it was found that female friendships tend to be dyadic. Women's support circles tend to be much larger than men's. Women also have a higher likelihood to have a BFF, this role is the closest and most intimate friend from whom the most support and closeness is expected and often received. Women in friendships tend to partake in more intimate self disclosure, empathising and alloparenting. Women have a tendency on average to have friendships that are more intimate and focused on individual attachments.

== See also ==
- Cross-sex friendship
- No homo
