= Heterosociality =

Socializing with the opposite sex

In sociology, heterosociality describes social relations with persons of the opposite sex or a preference for such relations, often excluding relationships of a romantic and sexual nature. The opposite of heterosociality is homosociality.

At an institutional level, the spread of heterosociality, epitomized by the entrance of women into public life and space, is closely associated with the progress of modernization.

== Terminology ==
The term heterosocial can refer to either:

- an individual who prefers to befriend or socialize with the opposite sex, as opposed to homosocial (preferring same-sex social relations) or bisocial (enjoying social relations with both sexes)
- a social relationship between two people who are of different sexes, as opposed to homosocial (of the same sex).

Whether the term can be applied to groups of three or more people has been disputed. One possible argument is that such a group is homosocial if composed of people of a single sex, and bisocial if composed of people of both sexes, since in the latter case each member will be interacting with people of both sexes. On the other hand, Collins English Dictionary defines heterosocial as "relating to or denoting mixed-sex social relationships", without specification of whether it applies to relationships between two people or among larger groups, suggesting that the term can describe social interactions involving people of both sexes more generally.

== Historical developments ==
The pervasiveness of heterosociality in contemporary life can lead to the obscuring of its social construction as a late development in Western history. Writing of early society, Freud considered that there was "an unmistakable tendency to keep the sexes apart. Women live with women, men with men". Durkheim associated sexual totemism, binding men and women into two separate totemic corporations, with such a social division of the sexes. Even in the twentieth century, rules of etiquette in some traditional villages dictated that men and women do not greet each other when passing in public.

Urbanization and modernization have seen a gradual erosion of the barriers to male/female socialising, not without significant culture wars along the way over each particular new arena. Thus, for example, part of the hostility to the Elizabethan theatre lay in the fact that men and women freely intermingled in its audience; while dance halls and cabarets later offered similarly controversial new areas for heterosocial interaction, as too did amusement parks.

In the 21st century, the challenge presented to traditional societies by the way the discourse of modernity encourages heterosociality over an older homosociality continues to be a live issue.

== Impact on feminism ==
The 20th century opening up of the public sphere to women—work, politics, culture, education—was both fueled and fed by the feminist movement, but the increase in heterosociality which accompanied it was seen as double-edged by many feminists. On the one hand, it served to undercut older feminist homosocial bonds and support systems; on the other, it split the new feminist movement, as calls for separatist feminism challenged heterosociality, let alone heterosexuality, in ways many found unacceptable.

Post-feminism has generally accepted heterosociality, along with a new strategy of gender mainstreaming, but not without reservations as to the exploitative aspects of (for example) raunch culture within the new 21st century public gender regime.

== Adolescence ==
Acquiring heterosocial competence is a key adolescent task. Other-sex friendships, even more than romances, can play a key role in this process.

Different societies and different subcultures place varying restrictions upon adolescent heterosocial roles and opportunities. American teen culture in particular has been seen as aggressively promoting heterosociality over homosociality.

== Culture ==
The advancement of culture was seen by Henry James as linked to heterosociality. Similarly, Kenneth Clark saw the flourishing of 18th-century French culture as rooted in the heterosociality of the salon.

== See also ==
- Cross-sex friendship
- Compulsory heterosexuality
- Gender roles
- Human bonding
- Mixed-sex education
- Platonic love
- Romantic friendship
- Romantic orientation
- Sex differences in psychology
