= Homosociality =

Socializing with the same sex

In sociology, homosociality means same-sex friendships that are not of a romantic or sexual nature, such as friendship, mentorship, or others. The term was popularized by Eve Kosofsky Sedgwick in her discussion of male homosocial desire. Researchers who use the concept mainly do so to explain how men uphold their dominance in society.

The opposite of homosocial is heterosocial, describing non-sexual relations with the opposite sex. The term homoaffectivity is used to refer to bonds and affective actions that go beyond mere socialization.

== Definition and history ==
In 1976, Jean Lipman-Blumen defined homosociality as a preference for members of one's own sex – a social rather than a sexual preference. The term was popularized by Eve Kosofsky Sedgwick. She used the term, distinguished from homosexual, to connote a form of male bonding that is often accompanied by fear or hatred of homosexuality.

Predominantly homosocial arrangements include:

- Single-sex educational institutions
  - Men's colleges and Women's colleges
- Fraternities and sororities
- Madrassas
- Monasteries, convents, and other cloistered religious societies
- Military (historically exclusively male, although presently both sexes are accepted in some forces)
- Prisons
- Homeless shelters
- Yeshivot
- Harems, Purdah
- Public baths
- Sports club teams, particularly geared toward single-sex membership or to one unique all-male or all-female sport
- Exclusive male clubs or female clubs
- Historically, sailing-ships were often homosocial, manned by all-male crews of sailors, officers, merchants, etc. (for example, historian Marcus Rediker uses the term to describe the pirate world).
- Historically, to describe the all-male world of knightly life in medieval culture

Generally, the more polarized the gender roles and restrictive the sexual code, the more homosociality one expects to find in a society.

=== Sexual orientation ===
Homosociality, by definition, implies neither heterosexuality nor homosexuality. For example, a heterosexual male who prefers to socialize with men may be considered a homosocial heterosexual. The term is often used by feminists to emphasize aspects of solidarity between males. Some feminists also identify a close link between female homosociality, feminism, and lesbian desire, with Audre Lorde stating "the true feminist deals out of a lesbian consciousness whether or not she ever sleeps with women."

=== Popular culture ===
In popular culture, the word bromance has recently been used to refer to an especially close homosocial yet non-sexual relationship between two men. Bromance is most often used in the case of two heterosexual partners, although there have been prominent celebrity gay-straight bromances (also known as homomances or hobromances). The female equivalent is a womance.

== Empirical evidence ==
In a study by S. M. Rose, males and females between the ages of 20 and 28 were examined on their evaluations of same- and cross-sex friendships. Results showed a preference for same-sex friendships in both men and women. Cross-sex friendships were evaluated by men and women to be less helpful, and less loyal than same-sex friendships, and friendship formation was found to be different between cross-sex and same-sex friendships as well.

Depending on the culture, family and social structures, same-sex preferences have been found to develop between 3 and 9 years old. In their 1984 study, LaFreniere, Strayer, and Gauthier conducted a three-year-long study observing fifteen peer groups between the ages of 1 and 6 years old, 98 boys and 93 girls. The researchers found that segregation increased with age and that most Western children exhibit these preferences around 3–4 years old. However, in a study by Harkness and Super, where 152 Kenyan children were observed in rural settings, it was found that sex-preference in playmates did not occur until the ages of 6 to 9, when parental expectations and customary duties increased. Given this disparity, Harkness and Super argue that "when and how such gender segregation appears, is the joint product of the individual and the culturally constructed niche".

It appears that the social bias towards members of one's own sex can develop early in children. Specifically, studies have found that by the early age of 3 or 4, children prefer members of their own sex to members of the opposite sex. These findings were found for both male and female children. Moreover, a 1989 study by Carol Martin found that boys 4.5 years of age expressed significantly more dislike for a girl depicted as a "tomboy" than a boy depicted as a "sissy"; whereas boys 8.5 years of age express more dislike for a boy depicted as a "sissy". Martin argues that this suggests that children as young as 4 prefer their own sex regardless of gender-incongruent behavior. Around the age of 8, boys begin to adhere to and appreciate the social expectations for males—devaluing feminine behavior. It has also been shown that children aged 10–12 prefer same-sex socializing. That is, girls favored girls who socialized with other girls and boys liked boys who socialized with other boys.

== Use in research ==
=== Feminist theory ===
Feminist scholars such as Rosabeth Moss Kanter and Heidi Hartmann and others have emphasized the role of male homosociality in perpetuating perceived patterns of male dominance in the workplace. Kanter has explored "metaphorical 'homosocial reproduction' - how men attempt to reproduce their dominant power relations by only uniting with and sharing the same occupational space and privilege with those males" who resemble them - although "subsequent research has suggested some revisions of Kanter's underlying argument...[re] 'homosocial reproduction'". Timothy Laurie has criticized how "homosociality" is used in the sociology of masculinity, noting that "much extant research on [homosociality] retains the premise that men innately seek identification and communication with other men. The mysterious malepolitik is thus privileged over men's relationships to femininity, or women's relationships to masculinity".

Karen Gabriel offers a useful mapping of the working of homosociality in the context of India.

=== Homosociality and homosexuality ===
There is further controversy regarding the relationship between homosociality and homosexuality. Eve Kosofsky Sedgwick identifies a continuum between homosociality and homosexuality, going as far as correlating feminism and lesbian desire. This approach has been compared to Adrienne Rich's concept of the "lesbian continuum."

At the same time, Sedgwick "defines male homosociality as a form of male bonding with a characteristic triangular structure. In this triangle, men have intense but nonsexual bonds with other men, and women serve as the conduits through which those bonds are expressed". Sedgwick's analysis of "the love triangle in which two men appear to be competing for a woman's love...develops René Girard's claim that such a triangle may disguise as rivalry what is actually an attraction between men". Girard argued that "the homosexual drift stems logically from the fact that the model/rival is a man", producing at times a "noticeably increased preponderance of the mediator and a gradual obliteration of the [female] object".

Research at the Australian Research Centre in Sex, Health and Society (ARCSHS), La Trobe University, has found that mutual identification over heterosexual activity is often the medium through which male homosocial bonding is enacted.

== See also ==
- Affectional orientation
- Female bonding
- Heterosexual–homosexual continuum
- Homoeroticism
- Human bonding
- In-group favoritism
- Not Gay
