= Tsubaki to Tsumihoroboshi no Door =

Japanese manga series

- First tankōbon volume cover

椿と罪ほろぼしのドア
- Genre: Buddy comedy; Fantasy comedy
- Manga
- Written by: Ayumi Nagata
- Published by: Shogakukan
- Magazine: Hibana
- Original run: March 6, 2015 – May 7, 2016
- Volumes: 2
- icon

Tsubaki to Tsumihoroboshi no Door (Japanese: 椿と罪ほろぼしのドア, Hepburn: Tsubaki to Tsumihoroboshi no Doa) is a Japanese manga series written and illustrated by Ayumi Nagata. It was serialized in Shogakukan's seinen manga magazine Hibana from March 2015 to May 2016, with its chapters collected in two tankōbon volumes.

== Publication ==
Written and illustrated by Ayumi Nagata, Tsubaki to Tsumihoroboshi no Door was serialized in Shogakukan's seinen manga magazine Hibana from March 6, 2015, to May 7, 2016. Shogakukan collected its chapters in two tankōbon volumes, released on September 11, 2015, and August 12, 2016.

=== Volumes ===
No.	Japanese release date	Japanese ISBN
1	September 11, 2015	978-4-09-187198-5
2	August 12, 2016	978-4-09-187730-7
