= Womance =

Close relationship between women

A womance is a close but non-sexual, non-romantic relationship between two or more women. It is an exceptionally tight affectional, homosocial female bonding relationship exceeding that of usual friendship, and is distinguished by a particularly high level of emotional intimacy.

The word womance is a portmanteau of the words woman and romance. The emergence of the terms bromance and womance has been seen as reflecting increased relationship-seeking as a modern behavior. Although womance is sometimes seen as the female flip side of bromance, some have seen different nuances in the social construction of the two concepts. Hammarén sees "different values assigned to male and female friendships" and a dissimilarity in the "underlying power relation between the concepts", and Winch has asserted several differences in the social construction.

== Cultural references ==
=== Film ===
Examples of film womances seem to be less prevalent than bromances. In Her Shoes (2005), Baby Mama (2008), The Women (2008), Bride Wars (2009), The Sisterhood of the Travelling Pants (2005), Desatanakkili Karayarilla, an Indian Malayalam language movie (1986), and Bridesmaids (2011) have been seen as womances, and their characteristics and tropes discussed. Winch expands on the assertion that "The womance can be distinguished from earlier friendship films because of its focus on the female self as entrepreneurial self-project." She sees differences from bromance, in "practices of consumption and hypervisability differentiates their togetherness from the togetherness of the buddies of the bromance" as well as dissimilar themes—girlfriend competition, female solidarity in the face of concerns about economic security and bridezilla behavior.

The Australian feature film Jucy (2010) is billed as a "womantic comedy". Frances Ha (2013) has been seen as a character study, with two close female protagonists, who "have quite a womance going".

=== Television ===
Several 2010's TV series feature notable "womances" as well as the earlier TV series Laverne & Shirley and Mel & Sue.

=== Other ===
"Womance" has also been used to describe the real life friendship between female celebrities.

== See also ==
- Boston marriage
- Bromance
- Buddy film
- Female bonding
- Female buddy film
- Friendship
- Homoaffectivity
- Laotong
- Man date
- Platonic love
- Romantic friendship
- Showmance
- Sorority
- Queerplatonic relationship
