= Mancation =

Mancation is a term used to describe a vacation or trip taken by a group of male friends, typically for the purpose of bonding, having fun, and engaging in activities that are traditionally associated with masculinity. The term is a combination of "man" and "vacation". The term is believed to have come about in the 2000s, although the concept had existed considerably before then.

== Travel industry trend ==
The concept of a gender specific trip has "been around since the first caveman took his club and went hunting with the others in the tribe." Yet, mancation has become a buzzword in the travel business lately. Tapping into the success of marketing all-girls getaway packages, hotels and resorts have started featuring all-male bonding vacation packages that include everything from poker, to extreme sports, to spa treatments. Golfing is the most popular activity for all-male vacation groups, but destinations have developed unique programs to accommodate the growing trend. The latest mancation packages offer spiritual healing, culinary instruction, yoga, and sexual reawakening.

In promoting mancations, some organizers "have discovered that men tend to create ‘micro affinity groups’ in childhood, college, or grad school, and that the groups often take trips together." According to one online survey, about 34% of male respondents take at least one mancation every year. It is estimated that about 20 million American men go on mancations every year and collectively spend between $10 billion and $12 billion during these excursions. The majority of these men are married and between the ages of thirty and fifty-five years old.

During the summer of 2006, half of the Fairmont Hotel chain's 50 properties in the United States created mancation packages. For example, the Fairmont Chicago mancation package consists of a three-course steak dinner, a cocktail seminar, whiskey tasting, cigars, and poker.

A 2008 study conducted by the Synovate research firm showed that 42% of men have taken a mancation, and 42% would like to in the future. The Jim Beam and Knob Creek bourbon brands used the statistics to promote a guys' trip to the Bourbon Trail in Kentucky for National Bourbon Heritage Month, occurring annually in September.

== Etymology ==
During the summer of 2006, actor Vince Vaughn said it in the romantic comedy film The Break-Up, written by Jay Lavender and Jeremy Garelick, stating: "I’m excited. I look at it like I’m on a mancation." In April 2007, New Line Cinema and Benderspink green-lit a comedy written by Jared Bush entitled Mancation, which follows a man who believes his younger brother's manhood has been robbed by marriage. In an attempt to regain this manhood, he takes his little brother on a "testosterone-filled 'mancation.'"

Other slang terms associated with getaways for groups of men are "mancursions", "man trips" or "fellas trips".
