= Homoaffectivity =

Expressions of affection and appreciation between individuals of the same sex

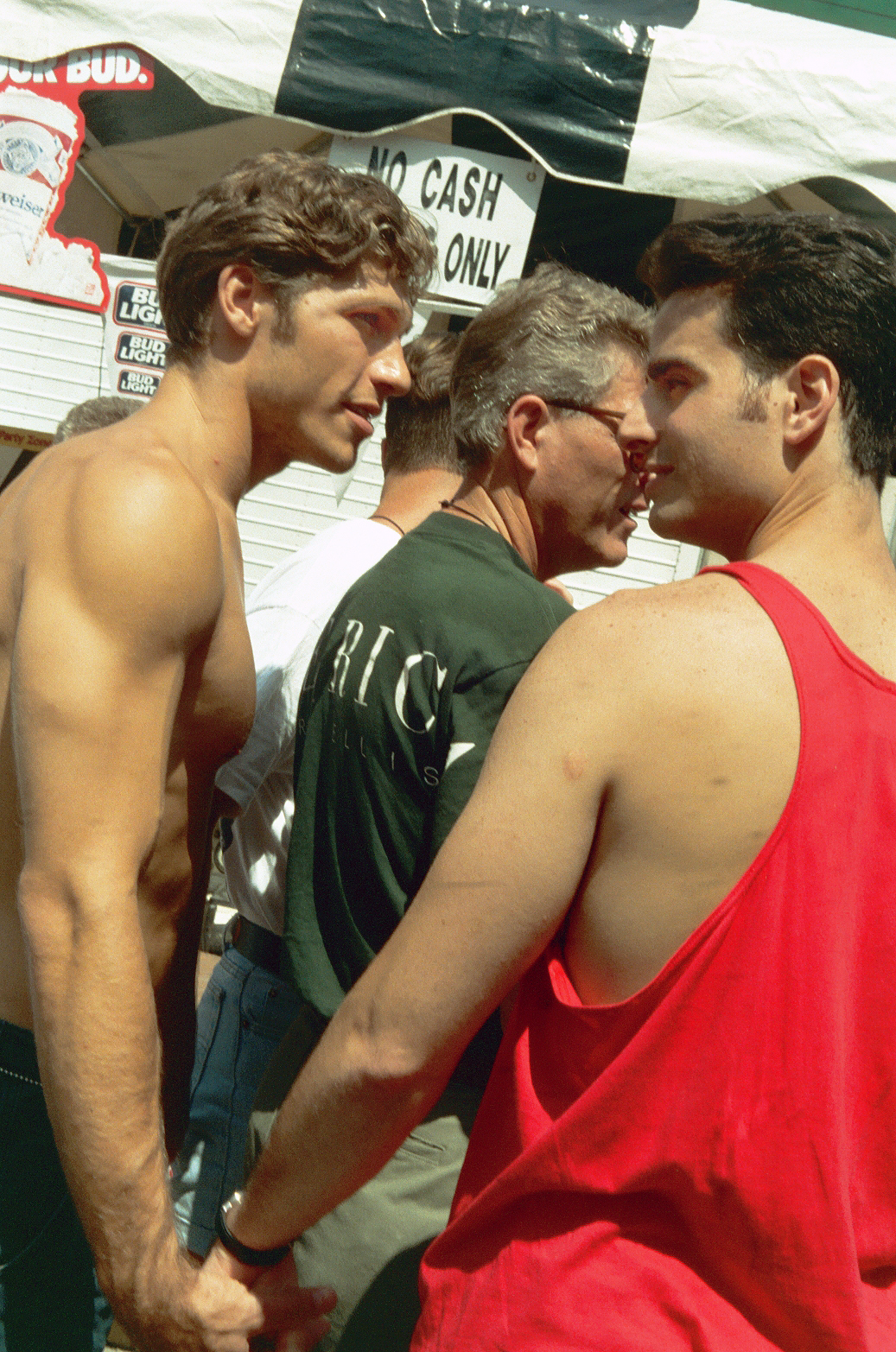
Two men holding hands is a homoaffective act that does not necessarily have a sexual or erotic background.

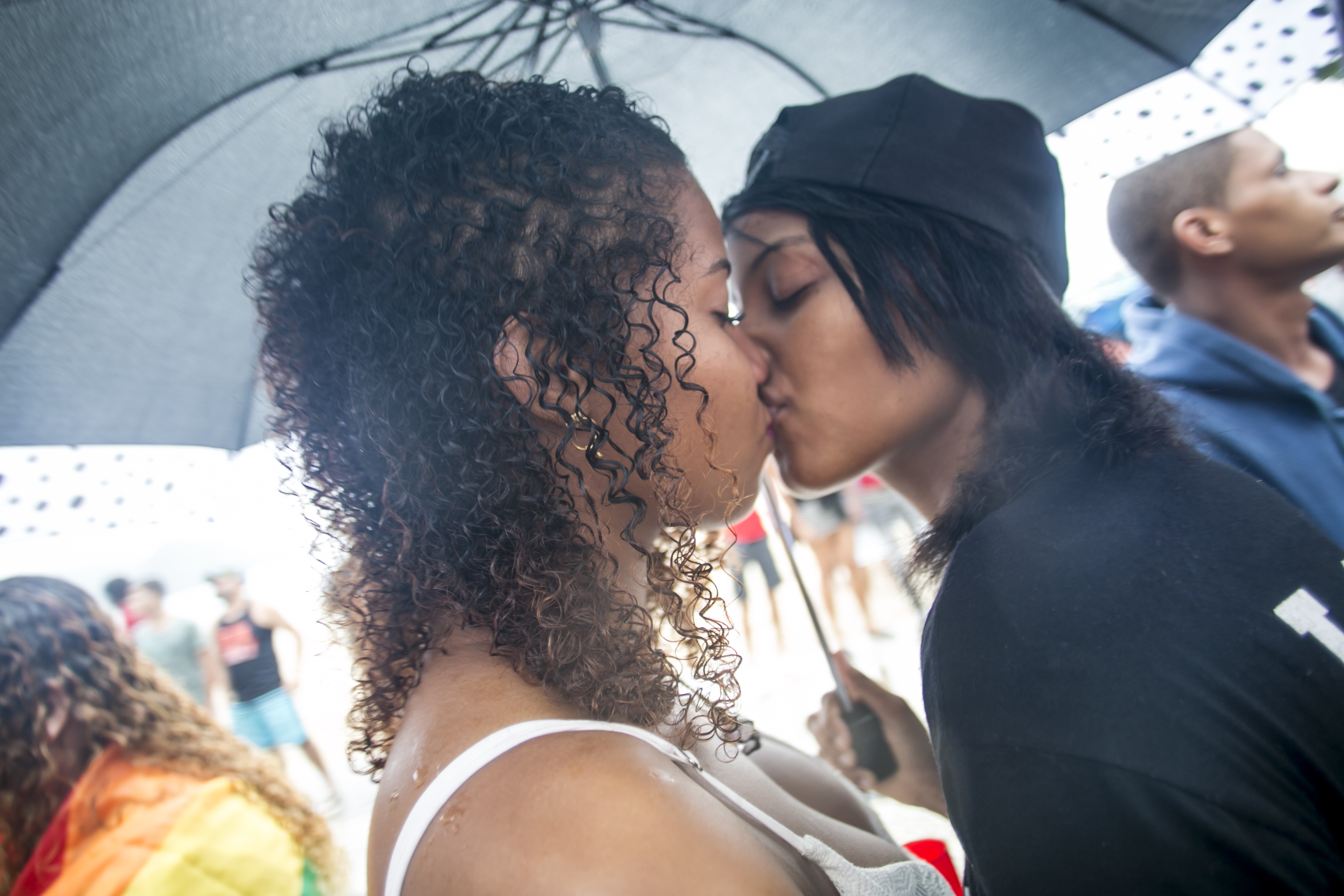
A affectionate kiss between women during 2016 Niterói LGBT Pride Parade

Homoaffectivity is a neologism describing expressions of affection and appreciation between individuals of the same sex. It refers to emotions and feelings that may occur between men or between women, without necessarily implying erotic (homoeroticism) or sexual (homosexuality) connotations. The term is used to distinguish same-sex interactions that carry different implications and contexts. Homoaffectivity has been studied and applied in various fields, including the social sciences — particularly psychology and sociology — as well as law, especially family law, literature studies and theology.

== Origin ==
The first formal studies mentioning homoaffectivity appeared in the early 21st century in the context of analyzing same-sex behavior.

Brazilian jurist and LGBT activist Maria Berenice Dias was the first to coin the term and apply it in the legal field, seeking to reduce the stigmatization of same-sex couples in Brazil who maintain stable and lasting emotional relationships.

The related concept of homosociality is sometimes used for similar purposes, but refers to a broader scope, encompassing all types of interactions among same-sex people, whether gay or straight, regardless of emotional content.

== Description ==
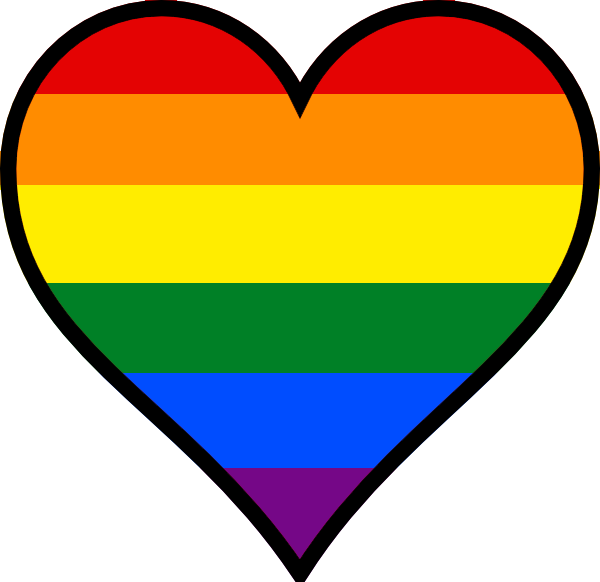
Rainbow flag within a heart symbol

Homoaffective practices may include kissing, hugging, any type of physical intimacy in public spaces, holding hands, and affectionate words between persons of the same sex. Such actions can be performed by individuals of any sexual orientation. In other words, two people of the same sex may kiss on the cheek, embrace, or otherwise express mutual affection without necessarily being gay or bisexual. Depending on the social context and historical moment, these practices may be more or less tolerated. The term has also been adopted in gender studies, where it refers to the sense of brotherhood and appreciation one person may feel toward others of the same sex.

A paradox of homoaffectivity is that such behaviors are tolerated differently depending on the perceived sexual orientation of those involved. For example, in many Muslim-majority countries, it is common for two friends regarded as heterosexual to kiss or embrace in public, while similar behavior between two homosexual men is not equally accepted.

The adjective is used by the Brazilian LGBT organization ABRAFH (Brazilian Association of Homotransaffective Families), which articulates demands for the rights of homoparental families. The word polyaffectivity, describing polyamory or polyfidelity juridically, also uses the same suffix.

== See also ==
- Bromance
- Homoromanticism
- Homosocialization
- Womance
