= Human bonding =

Process of development of a close, interpersonal relationship

Human bonding is the process of development of a close interpersonal relationship between two or more people. It most commonly takes place between family members or friends, but can also develop among groups, such as sporting teams and whenever people spend time together. Bonding is a mutual, interactive process, and is different from simple liking. It is the process of nurturing social connection.

Bonding typically refers to the process of attachment that develops between romantic or platonic partners, close friends, or parents and children. This bond is characterised by emotions such as affection and trust. Any two people who spend time together may form a bond. Male bonding refers to the establishment of relationships between men through shared activities. The term female bonding refers to the formation of close personal relationships between women. Cross-sex friendships refers to personal relationships between men and women.

== Early views ==
In the 4th century BC, the Greek philosopher Plato argued that love directs the bonds of human society. In his Symposium, Eryximachus, one of the narrators in the dialog, states that love goes far beyond simple attraction to human beauty. He states that it occurs throughout the animal and plant kingdoms, as well as throughout the universe. Love directs everything that occurs, in the realm of the gods as well as that of humans (186a–b).

Eryximachus reasons that when various opposing elements such as wet and dry are "animated by the proper species of Love, they are in harmony with one another... But when the sort of Love that is crude and impulsive controls the seasons, he brings death and destruction" (188a). Because it is love that guides the relations between these sets of opposites throughout existence, in every case it is the higher form of love that brings harmony and cleaves toward the good, whereas the impulsive vulgar love creates disharmony.

Plato concludes that the highest form of love is the greatest. When love "is directed, in temperance and justice, towards the good, whether in heaven or on earth: happiness and good fortune, the bonds of human society, concord with the gods above—all these are among his gifts" (188d).

In the 1660s, the Dutch philosopher Spinoza wrote, in his Ethics of Human Bondage or the Strength of the Emotions, that the term bondage relates to the human infirmity in moderating and checking the emotions. That is, according to Spinoza, "when a man is prey to his emotions, he is not his own master, but lies at the mercy of fortune."

In 1809 Johann Wolfgang von Goethe, in his classic novella Elective Affinities, wrote of the "marriage tie," and by analogy shows how strong marriage unions are similar in character to that by which the particles of quicksilver find a unity together through the process of chemical affinity. Humans in passionate relationships, according to Goethe, are analogous to reactive substances in a chemical equation.

== Pair bonding ==
The term pair bond originated in 1940 in reference to mated pairs of birds; referring to a monogamous or relatively monogamous relationship. Whilst some form of monogamy may characterise around 90% of bird species, in mammals long-term pairing (beyond the brief duration of copulation itself) is rare, at around 3% (see animal monogamy). The incidence of monogamy in primate species is similarly low in contrast with polygyny (one male mating with two or more females), the most common pattern. However, regardless of mating patterns, primate life is typically characterised by long-lasting social relationships (whether sexual, care-giving, coalitionary or otherwise) formed in the context of living in durable social groups, and any such durable relationship (whether exclusive or not) is characterised by some degree of bonding. Similarly, whilst the 'naturalness' of monogamy in humans is debated, durable monogamous or polygamous relationships will typically be accompanied by affectional or emotional bonding (see next section).

=== Limerent bond ===
According to limerence theory, posited in 1979 by psychologist Dorothy Tennov, a certain percentage of couples may go through what is called a limerent reaction, in which one or both of the pair may experience a state of passion mixed with continuous intrusive thinking, fear of rejection, and hope. Hence, with all human romantic relationships, one of three varieties of bonds may form, defined over a set duration of time, in relation to the experience or non-experience of limerence:

1. Affectional bond: define relationships in which neither partner is limerent.
2. Limerent–Nonlimerent bond: define relationships in which one partner is limerent.
3. Limerent–Limerent bond: define relationships in which both partners are limerent.

The constitution of these bonds may vary over the course of the relationship, in ways that may either increase or decrease the intensity of the limerence. A characteristic of this delineation made by Tennov, is that based on her research and interviews with over 500 people, all human bonded relationships can be divided into three varieties being defined by the amount of limerence or non-limerence each partner contributes to the relationship.

== Parental bonding ==
=== Attachment ===
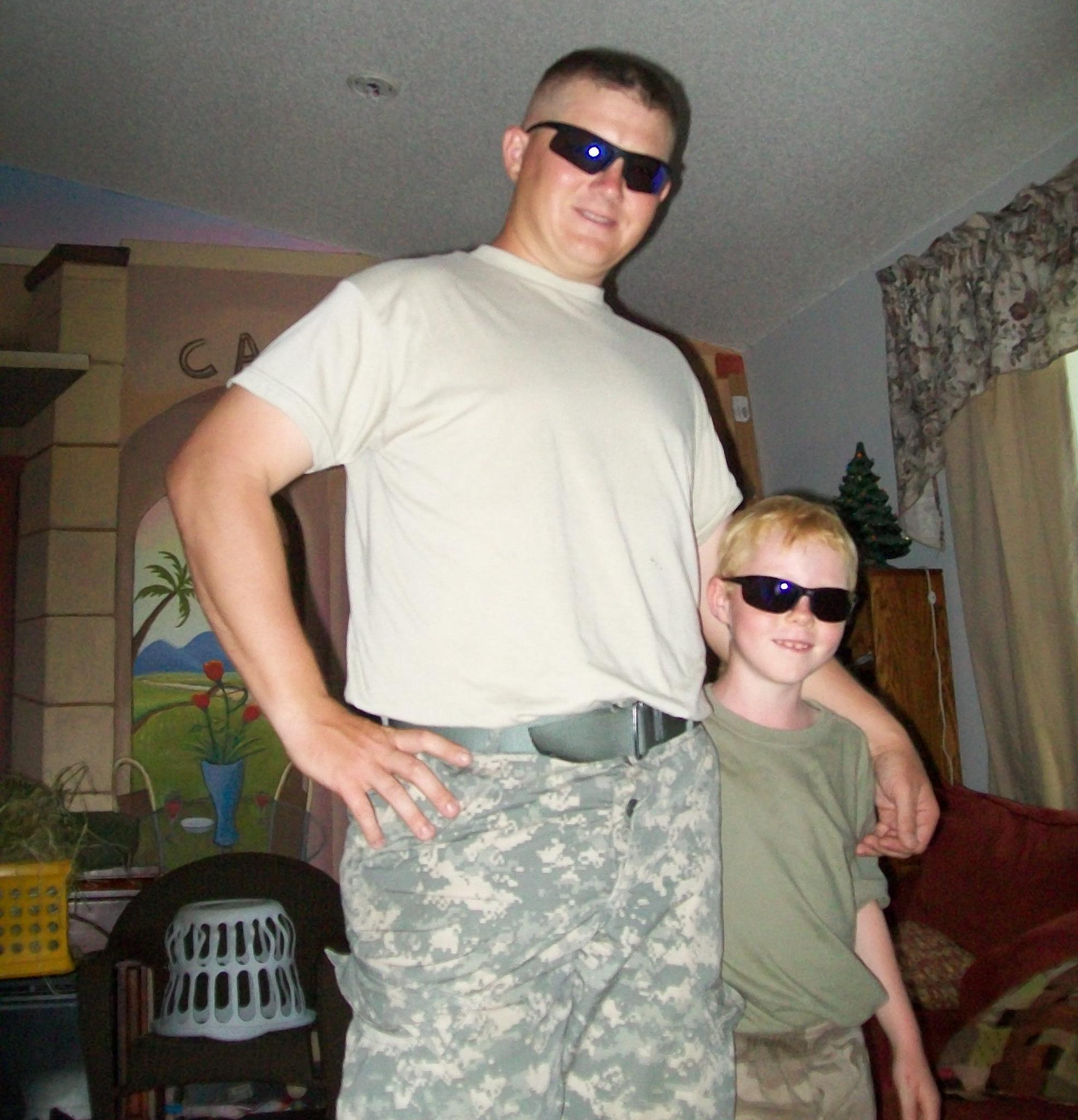
Parental bonds often help children form their identity.

In 1958, British developmental psychologist John Bowlby published the paper "the Nature of the Child's Tie to his Mother," in which the precursory concepts of "attachment theory" were developed. This included the development of the concept of the affectional bond, which is based on the universal tendency for humans to attach, i.e. to seek closeness to another person and to feel secure when that person is present. Attachment theory has some of its origins in the observation of and experiments with animals, but is also based on observations of children who had missed typical experiences of adult care. Much of the early research on attachment in humans was done by John Bowlby and his associates. Bowlby proposed that babies have an inbuilt need from birth to make emotional attachments, i.e. bonds, because this increases the chances of survival by ensuring that they receive the care they need. Bowlby did not describe mutuality in attachment. He stated that attachment by mother was a pathological inversion and described only behaviors of the infant. Many developmental specialists elaborated Bowlby's ethological observations. However, neither Bowlby's proximity seeking (not possible for human infants prior to walking) nor subsequent descriptions of caregiver–infant mutuality with emotional availability and synchrony with emotional modulation include the enduring motivation of attachment into adult life. The enduring motivation is the desire to control a pleasantly surprising transformation that is the route of belief in effectiveness by humans. This motivation accounts for curiosity and intellectual growth of language, mathematics and logic, all of which have an emotional base of security.

=== Maternal bonding ===
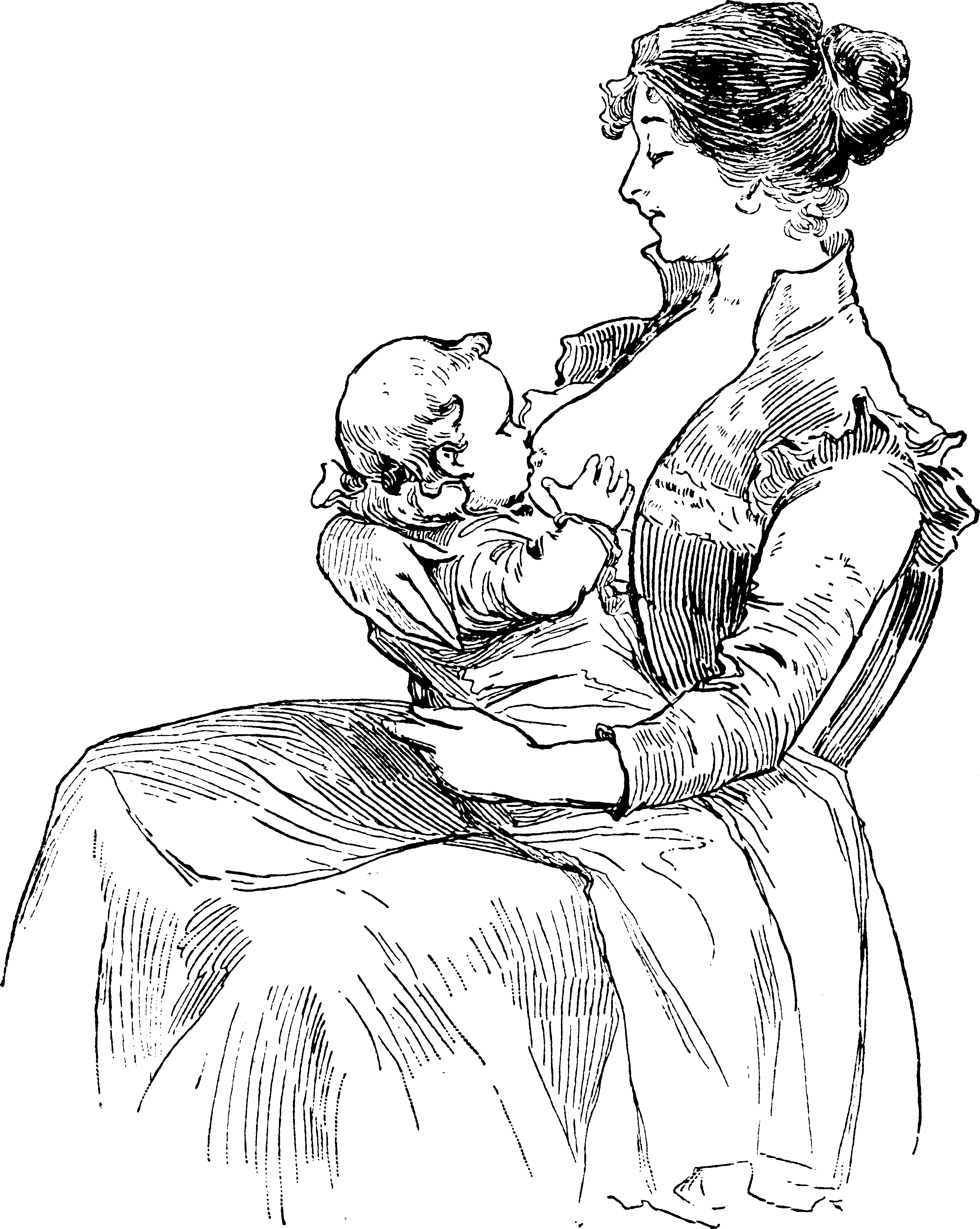
A mother breast feeding—a process that facilitates mother–infant bonding

Of all human bonds, the maternal bond (mother–infant relationship) is one of the strongest. The maternal bond begins to develop during pregnancy; following pregnancy, the production of oxytocin during lactation increases parasympathetic activity, thus reducing anxiety and theoretically fostering bonding. It is generally understood that maternal oxytocin circulation can predispose some mammals to show caregiving behavior in response to young of their species.

Breastfeeding has been reported to foster the early post-partum maternal bond, via touch, response, and mutual gazing. Extensive claims for the effect of breastfeeding were made in the 1930s by Margaret Ribble, a champion of "infant rights," but were challenged by others. The claimed effect is not universal, and bottle-feeding mothers are generally appropriately concerned with their babies. It is difficult to determine the extent of causality due to a number of confounding variables, such as the varied reasons families choose different feeding methods. Many believe that early bonding ideally increases response and sensitivity to the child's needs, bolstering the quality of the mother–baby relationship—however, many exceptions can be found of highly successful mother–baby bonds, even though early breastfeeding did not occur, such as with premature infants who may lack the necessary sucking strength to be successfully breastfed.

Research following Bowlby's observations (above) created some concern about whether adoptive parents have missed some crucial period for the child's development. However, research regarding The Mental and Social Life of Babies suggested that the "parent-infant system," rather than a bond between biologically related individuals, is an evolved fit between innate behavior patterns of all human infants and equally evolved responses of human adults to those infant behaviors. Thus nature "ensures some initial flexibility with respect to the particular adults who take on the parental role."

=== Paternal bonding ===
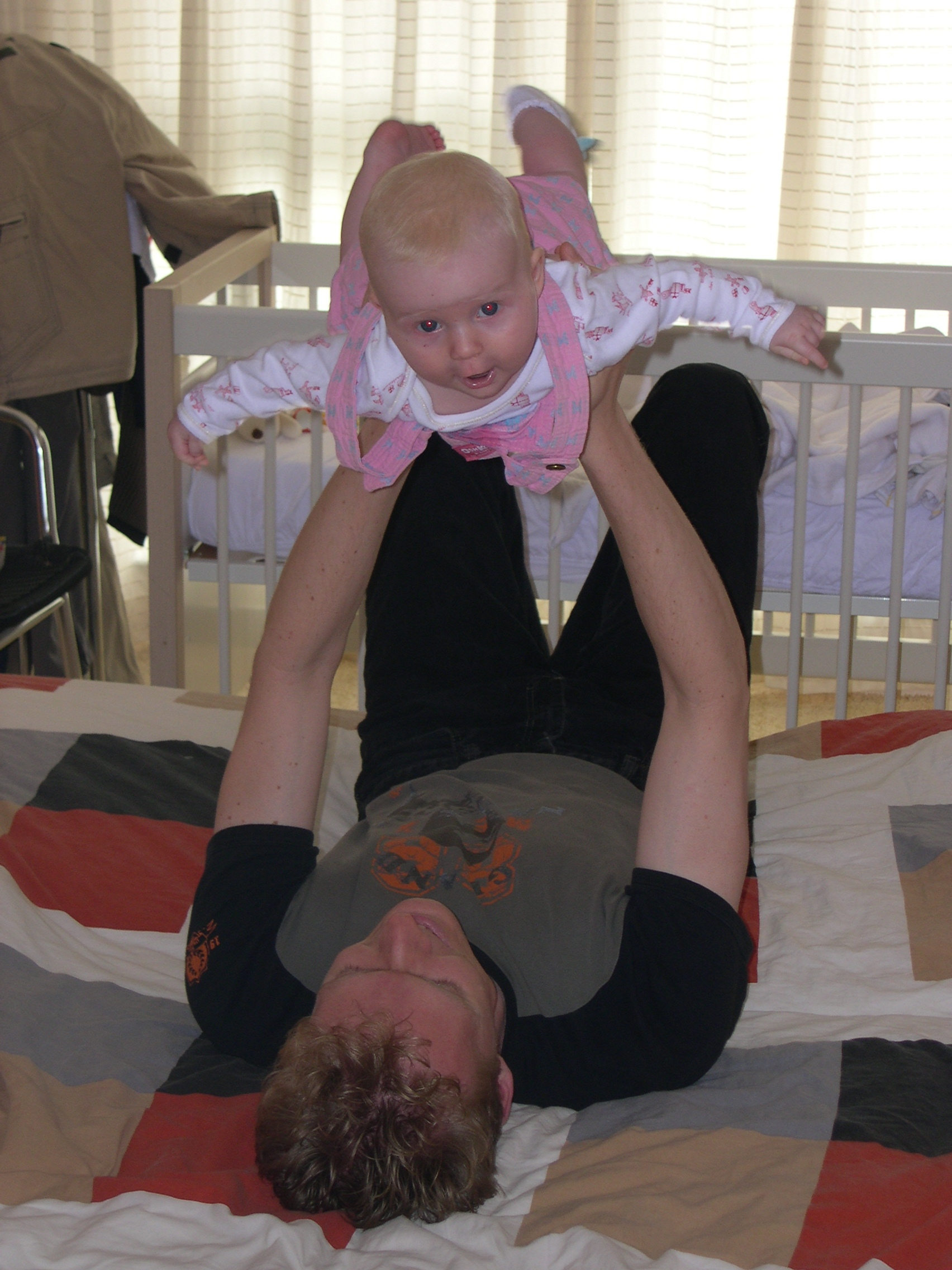
Father playing with his daughter—an activity that tends to strengthen the father–child bond

In contrast to the maternal bond, paternal bonds tend to vary over the span of a child's development in terms of both strength and stability. In fact, many children now grow up in fatherless households and do not experience a paternal bond at all. In general, paternal bonding is more dominant later in a child's life after language develops. Fathers may be more influential in play interactions as opposed to nurturance interactions. Father–child bonds also tend to develop with respect to topics such as political views or money, whereas mother–child bonds tend to develop in relation to topics such as religious views or general outlooks on life.

In 2003, a researcher from Northwestern University in Illinois found that progesterone, a hormone more usually associated with pregnancy and maternal bonding, may also control the way men react towards their children. Specifically, they found that a lack of progesterone reduced aggressive behavior in male mice and stimulated them to act in a fatherly way towards their offspring.

== Human–animal bonding ==
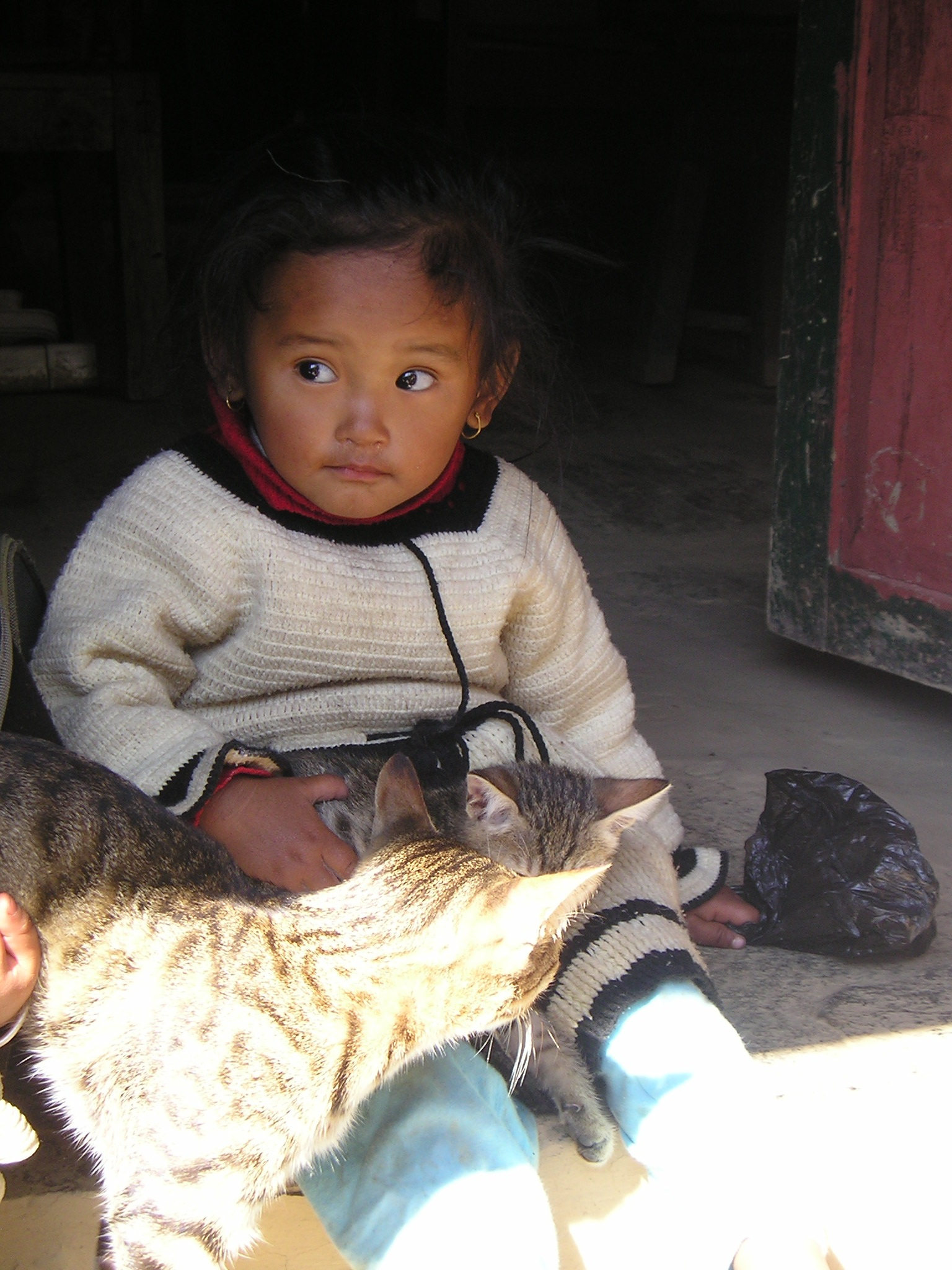
A child bonding with a cat. Human to animal contact is known to reduce the physiological characteristics of stress.

The human–animal bond can occur between people and domestic or wild animals; be it a cat as a pet or birds outside one's window. The phrase "Human-Animal Bond" or HAB began to emerge as terminology in the late 1970s and early 1980s. Research into the nature and merit of the human–animal bond began in the late 18th century when, in York, England, the Society of Friends established The Retreat to provide humane treatment for the mentally ill. By having patients care for the many farm animals on the estate, society officials theorized that the combination of animal contact plus productive work would facilitate the patients' rehabilitation. In the 1870s in Paris, a French surgeon had patients with neurological disorders ride horses. The patients were found to have improved their motor control and balance and were less likely to suffer bouts of depression.

During the 1820s to 1870s, America's Victorian middle class used the human–animal bond to aid in children's socialization. This was an entirely gendered process, as parents and society believed only boys had an innate tendency towards violence and needed to be socialized towards kindness and empathy through companion animals. Over time pet-keeping to socialize children became more gender neutral, but even into the 1980s and 90s there remained a belief that boys especially benefited from pet-keeping due to the fact that it was one of only ways they could practice nurturing given the limiting gender norms.

An example of the human–animal bond can be seen during World War I on the Western Front with horses. The use of this animal was widespread, as over 24,000 horses and mules were used in the Canadian Expeditionary Force in World War I. The horse connection can be seen as horses were used to pull wagons for their drivers, as individual transport mounts for officers, and patients for veterinarians. When researching the human–animal bond, there is a danger of anthropomorphism and projections of human qualities.

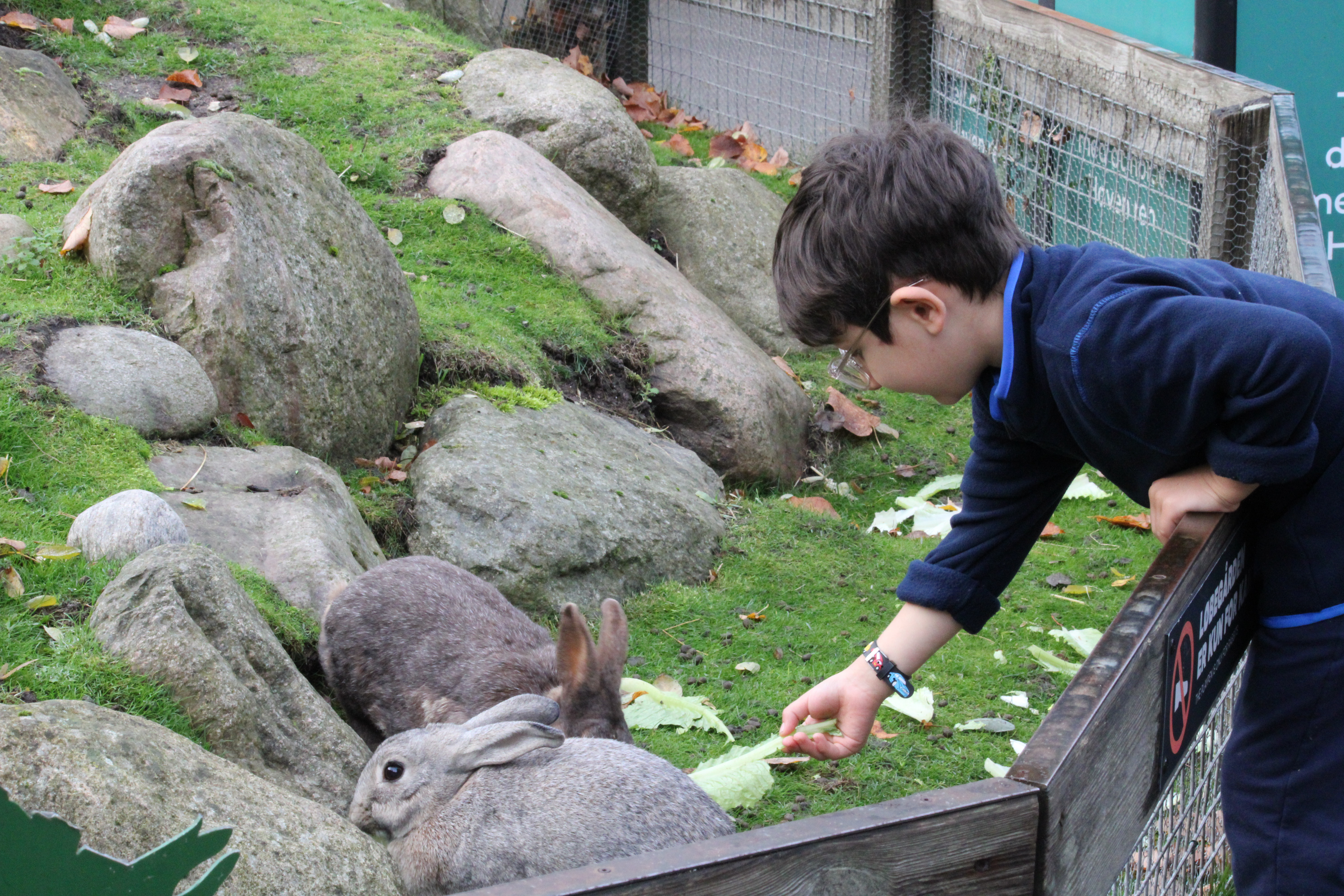
A boy feeding domestic rabbits at Copenhagen Zoo, 2025

In the 19th century, in Bielefeld, Germany, epileptic patients were given the prescription to spend time each day taking care of cats and dogs. The contact with the animals was found to reduce the occurrence of seizures. As early as the 1920s, people were starting to utilize the human–animal bond not just for healing, but also granting independence through service animals. In 1929, The Seeing Eye Inc. school formed to train guide dogs for the blind in the United States, inspired by dogs being trained to guide World War I veterans in Europe. Furthermore, the idea is that the human-animal bond can provide health benefits to humans as the animals "appeal to fundamental human needs for companionship, comfort, and security..." In 1980, a team of scientists at the University of Pennsylvania found that human to animal contact was found to reduce the physiological characteristics of stress; specifically, blood pressure, heart rate, respiratory rate, anxiety, and tension were all found to correlate inversely with human–pet bonding.

In some cases, despite its benefits, the human–animal bond can be used for harmful purposes. The 1990s saw an increase in social and scientific awareness of the use of companion animals as a tool for domestic violence. A 1997 study found that 80% of shelters reported women staying with them had experienced their abuser threatening or harming companion animals as a form of abuse.

A 2003 study by the U.S. Department of Defense on human–animal bonding determined that there was an improvement and enrichment of life when animals were closely involved with humans. The study tested blood levels and noticed a rise in oxytocin in humans and animals which participated; oxytocin has the ability to lower stress, heart rate, and fear levels in humans and animals.

Historically, animals were domesticated for functional use; for example, dogs for herding and tracking, and cats for killing mice or rats. Today, in Western societies, their function is primarily bonding. For example, current studies show that 60–80% of dogs sleep with their owners at night in the bedroom, either in or on the bed. Moreover, in the past the majority of cats were kept outside (barn cats) whereas today most cats are kept indoors (housecats) and considered part of the family. Currently, in the US, for example, 1.2 billion animals are kept as pets, primarily for bonding purposes. In addition, as of 1995, there were over 30 research institutions looking into the potential benefits of the human–animal bond.

== Neurobiology ==
There is evidence in a variety of species that the hormones oxytocin and vasopressin are involved in the bonding process, and in other forms of prosocial and reproductive behavior. Both chemicals facilitate pair bonding and maternal behavior in experiments on laboratory animals. In humans, there is evidence that oxytocin and vasopressin are released during labor and breastfeeding, and that these events are associated with maternal bonding. According to one model, social isolation leads to stress, which is associated with activity in the hypothalamic-pituitary-adrenal axis and the release of cortisol. Positive social interaction is associated with increased oxytocin. This leads to bonding, which is also associated with higher levels of oxytocin and vasopressin, and reduced stress and stress-related hormones.

Oxytocin is associated with higher levels of trust in laboratory studies on humans. It has been called the "cuddle chemical" for its role in facilitating trust and attachment. In the reward centers of the limbic system, the neurotransmitter dopamine may interact with oxytocin and further increase the likelihood of bonding. One team of researchers has argued that oxytocin only plays a secondary role in affiliation, and that endogenous opiates play the central role. According to this model, affiliation is a function of the brain systems underlying reward and memory formation.

Because the vast majority of this research has been done on animals—and the majority of that on rodents—these findings must be taken with caution when applied to humans. One of the few studies that looked at the influence of hormones on human bonding compared a control group with participants who had recently fallen in love. There were no differences for most of the hormones measured, including LH, estradiol, progesterone, DHEAS, and androstenedione. Testosterone and FSH were lower in men who had recently fallen in love, and there was also a difference in blood cortisol for both sexes, with higher levels in the group that was in love. These differences disappeared after 12–28 months and may reflect the temporary stress and arousal of a new relationship.

=== Prolactin ===
Prolactin is a peptide hormone primarily produced in the anterior pituitary gland. Prolactin affects reproduction and lactation in humans and other non-human mammals. It is also thought to mediate the formation of social bonds between mothers and their infants, much like the hormone oxytocin. In addition to prolactin's role in the formation of social bonds, it is thought to be involved in romantic attachment, especially in its early stages. Prolactin may also act to mediate well-being and the positive effects of close relationships on one's health. To do so, it alters an individual's neuroendocrine system to increase the probability of forming a strong social bond without requiring long gestation periods; this may enable bonding between mother and child in cases of adoption.

Prolactin can also influence both maternal and paternal behavior. The administration of prolactin to female rats initiates maternal behavior, and in bird and fish fathers, it can increase paternal behavior, whereas antagonists to prolactin decrease paternal behavior. In human studies, fathers with higher prolactin concentrations are more alert and nurturing towards their infants. In a different study where fathers and infants were observed over a six-months period after the child was born, the researchers found that fathers with higher prolactin levels were more likely to facilitate play with their infant. Moreover, following the birth of the child, prolactin promotes bonding between the father and the newborn.

Prolactin levels can also increase during socially stressful situations in humans. This has been seen by administering the Trier Social Stress Test (TSST), and then measuring blood serum prolactin concentrations. The TSST is a widely accepted stress test in which the research subject undergoes a mock job interview and then a mental arithmetic task in front of a three-person committee. This test is proven to simulate social psychological stress. After the administration of this test, significantly higher prolactin levels can be observed in the serum. There is a large variation in the amount prolactin levels increase in different individuals, however the effect is not significantly different between men and women

== Weak ties ==

In 1962, while a freshman history major at Harvard, Mark Granovetter became enamored of the concepts underlying the classic chemistry lecture in which "weak" hydrogen bonds hold huge numbers of water molecules together, which themselves are held together by "strong" covalent bonds. This model was the stimulus behind his famous 1973 paper The Strength of Weak Ties, which is now considered a classic paper in sociology.

Weak social bonds are believed to be responsible for the majority of the embeddedness and structure of social networks in society as well as the transmission of information through these networks. Specifically, more novel information flows to individuals through weak than through strong ties. Because our close friends tend to move in the same circles that we do, the information they receive overlaps considerably with what we already know. Acquaintances, by contrast, know people that we do not, and thus receive more novel information. There are some demographic groups, such as alexithymics, who may find it very difficult to bond or share an emotional connection with others.

== Debonding and loss ==
In 1953, sociologist Diane Vaughan proposed an uncoupling theory. It states that during the dynamics of relationship breakup, there exists a "turning point," only noted in hindsight, followed by a transition period in which one partner unconsciously knows the relationship is going to end, but holds on to it for an extended period, sometimes for a number of years.

When a person to which one has become bonded is lost, a grief response may occur. Grief is the process of accepting the loss and adjusting to the changed situation. Grief may take longer than the initial development of the bond. The grief process varies with culture.

== See also ==
- Attachment parenting
- Fission-fusion society
- Investment model of commitment
- Limbic resonance
- Propinquity
- Relationship breakup
- Sexual dimorphism in human bonding
- Social connection
- Socionics
- Traumatic bonding
