= Bromance =

Close relationship between men

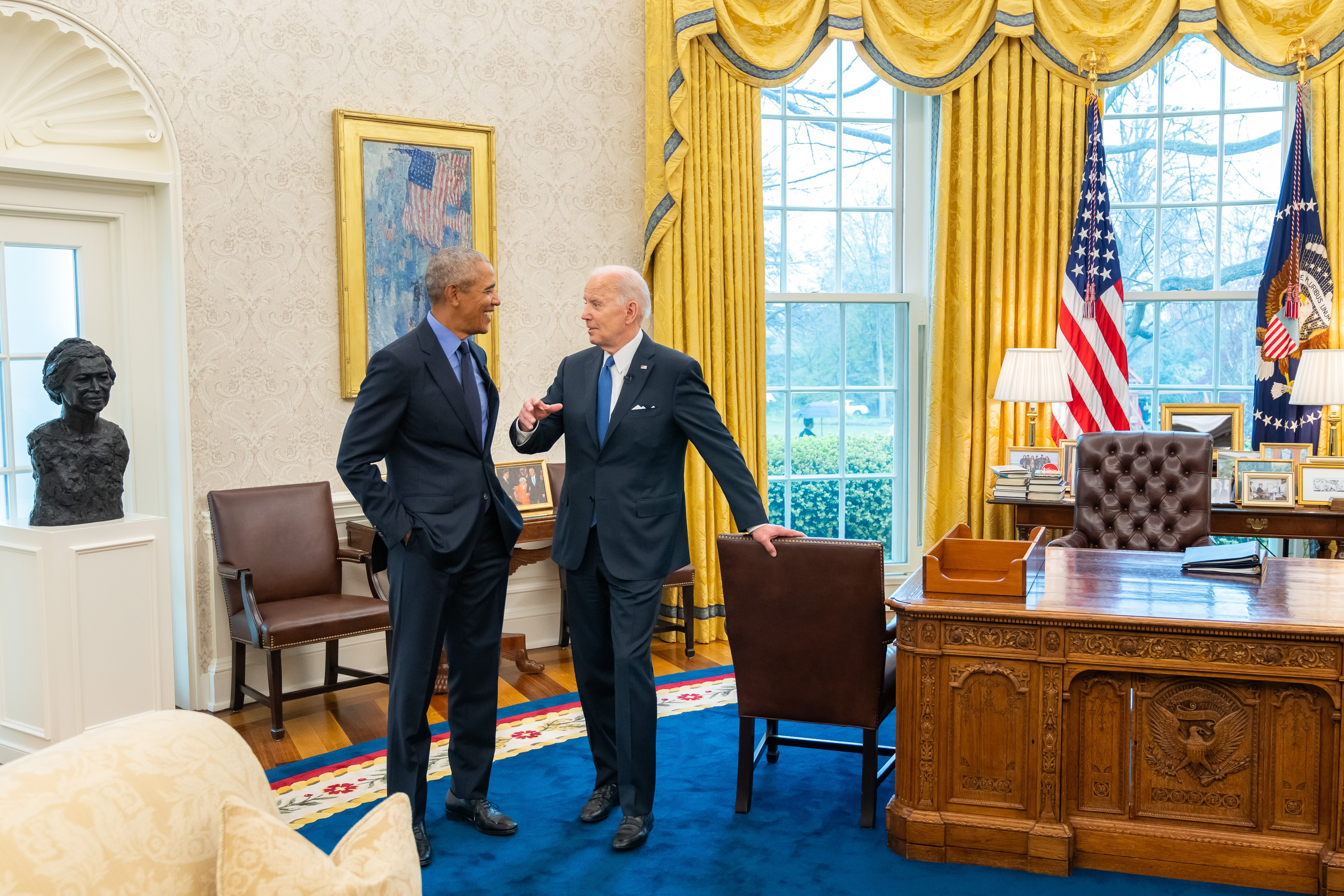
In 2017, US President Barack Obama's relationship with former US Vice President Joe Biden was described as a "bromance".

A bromance is a very close and non-sexual relationship between two or more men. It is an exceptionally tight, affectional, homosocial, male bonding relationship exceeding that of usual friendship, and is distinguished from normal friendship by a particularly high level of emotional intimacy. The emergence of the concept since the beginning of the 21st century has been seen as reflecting a change in societal perception and interest in the theme, with an increasing openness of Western society in the 21st century to reconsider exclusivity constraints. The female version of the bromance is the womance.

== Etymology ==
Bromance is a portmanteau of bro (or brother) and romance. Dave Carnie is credited with coining the term as editor of the skateboard magazine Big Brother in the 1990s to refer specifically to the sort of relationships that develop between skaters who spent a great deal of time together. The term did not attain broad currency until approximately 2005 when the theme became more prominent in the motion picture industry.

== Characteristics ==
Bromance has been examined from viewpoints such as historiography, discourse analysis, social research, and queer theory in book-length reviews. The emergence of bromance as a topic over the past decade has been seen as reflecting how society has collectively changed its perception and interest in the theme.

Several characteristics of bromance have been cited:

- Bromance conveys a male homosocial relationship that goes much further than traditional homosocial practices. The increased closeness goes beyond being mere friends, to a deep bond that has been characterized as capturing the conceptual edge of "is gay / is not gay".
- Its emergence as a distinctive conceptual genre and theme in the movie and television industry is seen as reflective of a "broader acceptance of non-heteronormative cultural expressions as well as the prospect of a same-sex intimacy that transcends matters of sexual orientation".
- Contemporary cultural circumstances, including the struggle for and attainment of gay marriage equality, and specific elements of the depiction of bromance in movies and television separate it from buddy films, as well as historic romantic friendships, which reflect a different social construction.

According to Chen, society has taken a collective interest in reexamination of some of the traditional constraints on male friendship, and in potentially reshaping the constructs of gender, sexuality, and intimacy. Bromance provides "a case study of gender, sexuality, and exclusivity constraints in twenty-first century America as they operate in law and beyond. Those constraints in turn speak to the privilege and subordination imbued in this type of relationship, with implications for other types as well." This is distinct from the connotations of romantic friendship, a term of 20th century historical scholarship that retrospectively described close homosocial relationships, which had become less common after potential physical intimacy between non-sexual partners came to be regarded with anxiety in the second half of the 19th century.

On the one hand, social interest in the theme has been seen as driving the film industry, which has then fed back to society at large, exploring peoples' mindsets and addressing acceptance of "other types of relationships" between people. On the other hand, some have seen the emphasis on platonic love as a rejection of homoeroticism, or as a deliberate confounding of homosocial and homoerotic relationships.

Bromance has also been seen as a reflection of greater "discursive expressivity". The experiences of friendship and masculinity, perhaps due to more open parenting styles from the 1970s, reflect a trend toward more openness emotionally, with increased expressivity. According to sociologist Peter Nardi, "men are less afraid of being perceived as gay. It has become more acceptable for them to show some emotion." Men are marrying later, if at all, which impacts male bonding. According to the 2010 US Census, the average age of a man's first marriage is 28, up from 23 in 1960; men with more education are waiting until their 30s before getting married.

== Criticism ==
Some people, including Randall Munroe, have criticised the term "bromance" as a superfluous term for friendship, implying that it is unusual for two men to be close friends, when such relationships are deemed normal between women, and "friends", "close friends" or "best friends" would all be equally accurate and valid ways of expressing the same thing. The term has also been criticised as implicitly homophobic.

== Celebrity ==
A number of celebrity relationships have been popularly characterised as "bromances". Although bromance is a new term, this treatment of celebrity relationships is not new.

=== Film celebrities ===
During the 1946 to 1956 "post-war eram" the comedy team Martin and Lewis "teased with a sly alternative to the model of heterosexual affirmation traditionally peddled by Hollywood, as their intense and unstable relationship showcased a panoply of emotional and erotic intensities between men. The cultural resonance of Martin and Lewis's comedy derived from the way it set in motion a more complex ‘queering of gender.’" They starred in 16 films together as an inseparable unit, as well as on early live television and in nightclubs. They had a large influence on millions of baby boomers and future comedians, (including George Clooney, whose aunt Rosemary Clooney was a guest on their show).

Ben Affleck and Matt Damon were described as "perhaps the pioneering bromance in showbiz history", which led to an off-Broadway play called Matt and Ben. The relationship between Zachary Quinto and Chris Pine, stars of the 2009 Star Trek film, has been described similarly, in common with their on-screen characters' relationship.

The close friendship between George Clooney and Brad Pitt was once suggested to be "George's longest-lasting affair". Clooney's bromantic tendencies served as the basis for an episode of the animated series American Dad! entitled "Tears of a Clooney", in which lead character Stan Smith becomes bromantically involved with Clooney as part of an elaborate revenge plot.

=== Athletes ===
Professional footballers Eric Dier and Dele Alli, who played together for both Tottenham Hotspur and the English national team, have a close relationship that has been described as a bromance.

During the 2016 Olympic 100m finals, the friendship between Jamaican Usain Bolt and Canadian Andre De Grasse emerged, characterized and celebrated on social media as a bromance.

Bodybuilders Arnold Schwarzenegger and Franco Columbu had a close relationship described by themselves as bromance, since 1965. Arnold and Franco were inseparable friends and training partners since then. They began a bricklaying and patio business called European Brick Works in 1969.

=== Between band members ===
The tight relationship both on- and off-stage between Bruce Springsteen and the late E Street Band saxophonist Clarence Clemons has often been described as one of the most fitting examples of bromance in Western modern music. This relationship is most notably depicted in Springsteen's song "Tenth Avenue Freeze-Out", from Born to Run – in which Springsteen and Clemons appear respectively under their many pseudonyms Bad Scooter and Big Man. It was also described in Clemons' autobiography Big Man: Real Life & Tall Tales.

The Japanese and Korean music industry actively encourages bromance among male celebrities (particularly members of boy bands) as part of the fan service to please the audience.

=== Gay-straight celebrity relationships ===
While the term has generally been applied to straight relationships, mixed gay-straight relationships without sexual intimacy have also been dubbed "bromances". Examples of well-known gay-straight bromances include George Michael and Andrew Ridgeley from the band Wham!; Ronnie Kroell and Ben DiChiara from the Bravo reality series Make Me a Supermodel, in which the pair was nicknamed "Bronnie"; the relationship on Survivor: Gabon between Charlie Herschel and Marcus Lehman; and American Idol's Kris Allen and Adam Lambert, which was given the name "Kradam".

== Cultural references ==
=== Film ===
Buddy films have to a degree been rebranded as bromance films, although critics draw a distinction between the two, noting that a buddy film tends to be more explicitly violent and less open about its latent homosexual content. The intersection between buddy films and what would come to be called the bromance film was noted comedically at least as early as 1978, when National Lampoon ran a parody ad for the football-themed buddy film Semi-Tough, renamed "Semi-Sweet" and featuring an illustration of stars Burt Reynolds and Kris Kristofferson holding hands.

Prominent examples of bromantic comedy include Judd Apatow's The 40-Year-Old Virgin (2005) and Knocked Up (2007), as well as Greg Mottola's Superbad (2007), which targeted non-sexual homosocial behavior and masculinity in inventive ways. Zoolander (2001), Wedding Crashers (2005), Funny People (2009), John Hamburg's I Love You Man (2009), The Hangover (2009), and Horrible Bosses (2011) are other examples.

Although J. R. R. Tolkien's novels predate the "bromance era", the portrayal of the lifelong close relationships between Frodo Baggins and Samwise Gamgee, Meriadoc Brandybuck and Peregrin Took, and Gimli and Legolas in the novels have been characterized as bromance, as well as the depictions in the films based on them.

=== Other ===
The cultural concept that bromance connotes particular closeness has been taken up thematically. The concept has been visited in biology, as well as an experimental acrobatic video dance piece, Bromance, which explores "... the intimacy of physical interaction between guys; of their ‘bromance’."

The relationship between George W. Bush and former press secretary Scott McClellan as told in McClellan's book What Happened was called by one reviewer "the tale of one long, failed bromance".

The former premiers Dalton McGuinty of Ontario (2003–2013) and Jean Charest of Quebec (2003–2012) were described as in a "burgeoning bromance". Stephen Harper of Canada (2006–2015) and Tony Abbott of Australia (2013–2015), and their respective countries, were characterized as having a "conservative bromance". The term has been used to describe Narendra Modi from India and Barack Obama from the United States during the January 2015 visit, and Vladimir Putin from the Russian Federation with Gerhard Schröder from Germany.

In early 2017, a number of internet memes surfaced which alluded to Obama's relationship with Vice President Joe Biden as a "bromance".

A bromance has been linked with a decrease in "problems such as anxiety, depression, heart disease, and memory and concentration impairment".

== See also ==
- I Love You, Man, a feature film that is centered around the concept of a bromance.
- Boy Meets World, a sitcom wherein the main character, Cory Matthews, has a lifelong bromance with his best friend, Shawn Hunter, that continues to thrive in its spin-off series Girl Meets World.
- Platonic love
- Romantic friendship
- Boston marriage
- Showmance
- Womance
- Bromantic comedy
- Friendship
- Mateship
- Best friends forever (BFF), a close friendship typical of teenage girls and young women.
- Homoaffectivity
