= Cross-sex friendship =

Friendship between an unrelated male and female

A cross-sex friendship is a platonic relationship between two non-familial people of differing sex or gender. While this kind of friendship is widespread in heterosexual culture, cross-sex friendships involving mixed sexual orientations often mirror mate-selection preferences and provide opportunities for short-term mating. Sometimes, the relationship may come to be regarded as familial. In general, pop culture tends to portray such friendships as impossible and views them with skepticism due to the potential for romantic and sexual attraction.

Modern research focuses on the unique challenges faced by cross-sex friends, examining why such relationships form, how they are perceived by friends and colleagues, and their effects on social development in children and adults.

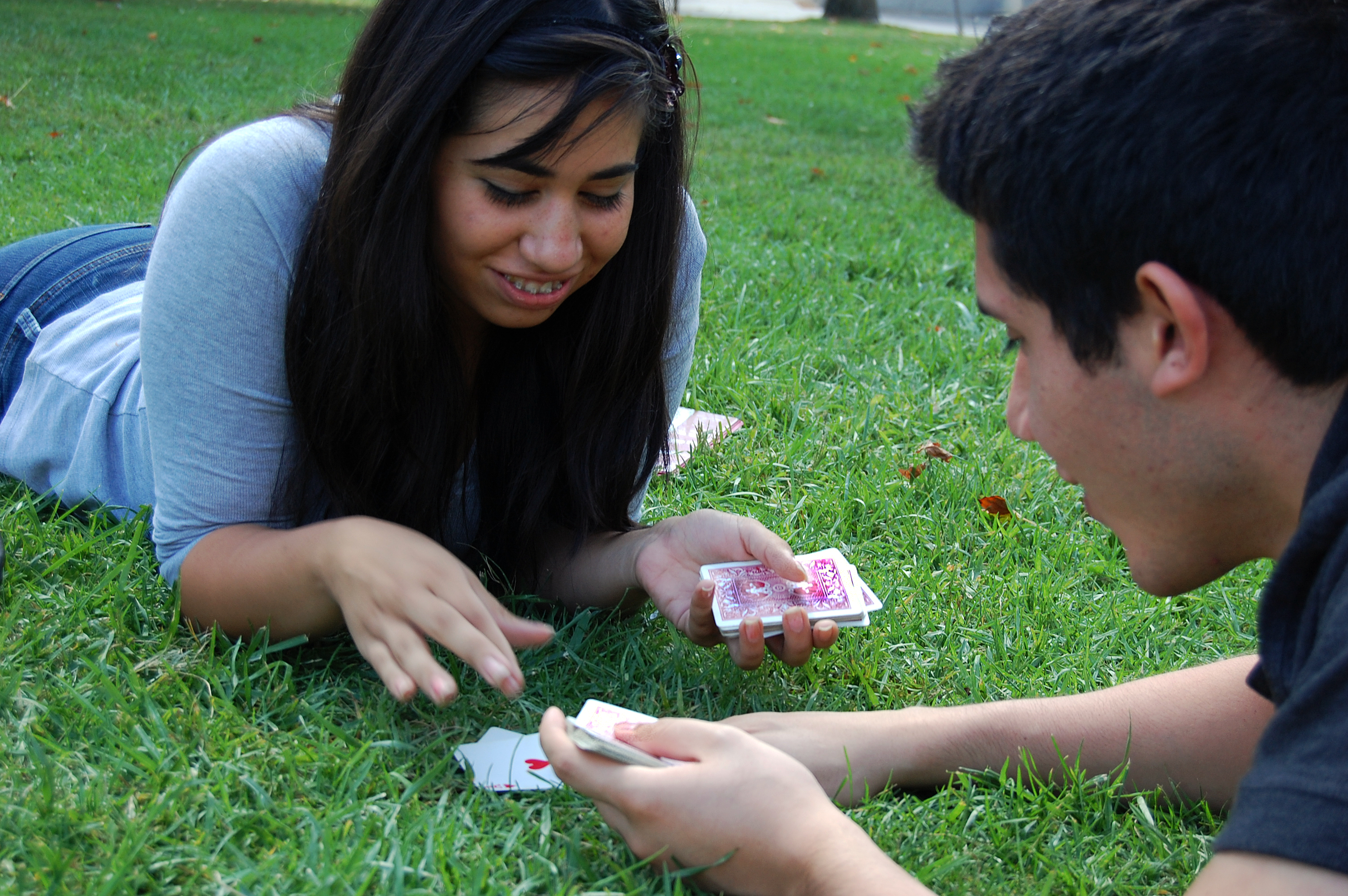
Two students of different genders playing a card game

== History ==
The concept of platonic love as a non-sexual relationship between heterosexuals has roots in the Renaissance.

In the 18th century Mary Wollstonecraft advocated for married women to seek lasting friendship with their husbands as love and sexual desire fade.

The modern concept of friendship between the sexes emerged in the late 19th century along with first-wave feminism, and was made possible by increased access to legal rights, employment, and education for women.

== Background ==
Cross-sex friendships play a large role in social relations of both men and women. They can be a cause of complications because of the potential for romance or sexual interactions. Monsour defines a cross-sex friendship as a "voluntary, non-familial, non-romantic, relationship between a female and a male in which both individuals label their association as a friendship". However, just because these friendships are labeled as "non-romantic", one cannot assume that there are no romantic or sexual undertones.

Guerrero and Chavez suggest that there are four types of cross-sex friendships: mutual romance, strictly platonic, desires romance, and rejects romance. In a "mutual romance" cross-sex friendship, one of the participants wants a romantic relationship with the other individual and the other individual wants the same. In "strictly platonic" relationships, the individual believes that the other simply wants to be just platonic friends with no thought of romance. In a "desires romance" cross-sex friendship, one individual wants the friendship to become a romantic relationship but does not believe the other individual wants a romantic relationship. In a "rejects romance" cross-sex relationship, one individual does not want the relationship to turn romantic, but believes that their friend does. Each of these friendship styles are based on the goals and viewpoint of the individual. Other theories and research discuss the causes and benefits of cross-sex friendships.

== Emotional bond ==
Cross-sex friends must negotiate the type of emotional bond they share or develop a shared sense of love. This is complicated by the fact such emotions are not easily distinguishable, and the trajectory of the relationship can include prior stages of romance or physical attraction, or be at a stable or intermediary stage.

It's common in American culture for a discontinued romantic relationship to continue as a friendship. If the couple were platonic friends before the romantic relationship, or are able to effectively communicate during a break-up, this outcome is more likely. Which partner initiated the break-up is a less-likely indicator. A relationship between ex-romantic partners is qualitatively different from those who were always platonic.

== Public perception ==
Since heterosexual romantic relationships are seen as more common than cross-sex friendships, others in a social group may assume a relationship has romantic or sexual potential. Cross-sex friends are challenged to maintain a public image of their relationship as authentic friendship. If the friendship is seen as authentically platonic, the friendship is strengthened by positive reinforcement within social groups. If people assume the relationship is romantic or hides a sexual component, cross-sex friends have to worry about the way they are perceived.

Acceptance of the relationship as non-romantic is especially significant if either friend has a romantic partner. Failure to maintain a public image of friendship can result in suspicion and jealousy in the romantic relationship. Due to this challenge existing cross-sex friendships come under strain when a person marries, and existing marriages make it difficult to develop new cross-sex friendships.

While members of cross-sex friendships spend a considerable amount of time thinking about how their relationship is perceived by others, surveys are mixed regarding whether it's a significant problem for them. Different types of cross-sex friendships, such as "strictly platonic" or "mutual romance", may face different degrees of challenge from an audience.

== Major theories ==
=== Evolutionary theory ===
Bleske-Rechek et al. theorize that cross-sex friendships are a part of humans' evolved mating strategies. Current mating strategies unconsciously motivate individuals to enter into cross-sex friendships because it gives them more opportunities to mate. As a result, individuals within these cross-sex friendships often develop attraction to the other individual, even when that attraction is completely unintended. This evolutionary theory predicts that cross-sex friendships are formed by males for sexual access and by females for protection. This demonstrates one way in which cross-sex friendships serve, in part, as a long term mating acquisition strategy. Having more opportunities to mate is an evolutionary advantage, however, being attracted to a cross-sex friend creates negative social consequences. This is especially true for younger adults who are attracted to a cross-sex friend, because these people report less satisfaction in their current romantic relationship. Also, middle-aged adults tend to nominate attraction to their cross-sex friends as more of a negative than a positive.

=== Social learning theory ===
In addition, social learning theory predicts that if cross-sex friendships are a result of the desire for sexual access and protection, this is because they are imitating other cross-sex friendships. Most popular television shows and movies suggest that the goal of forming cross-sex friendships is a romantic relationship. People learn from the friendships they see in popular culture and model their behavior after them.

Preference for same sex relationships is a societal norm that is taught to children from a young age. This homosocial norm encourages same sex friendships early on that shape how adolescents view and measure cross-sex friendships. Culturally supported rules about friendships and gender influence the formation of interpersonal relationships. For this reason, ideas of cross-sex friendship can vary from place to place. While diverse cultures view relationships across genders differently, studies have shown that similar ideals for friendship seem to exist around the world in areas such as the United States, Europe, and East Asia. Additionally, adolescent definitions of cross-sex friendships closely match definitions given by adults, suggesting that children develop perceptions on the matter by imitating the opinions of adults in their lives.

During adolescence, a distinction starts to form between romantic relationships and platonic friendships, which is influenced by personal experience as well as exposure to media and popular culture. Teenagers learn from portrayals of romance on television and base their own relationships on these representations. Popular media romanticizes and sexualizes interactions between people of opposite sexes, leading to a cultural expectation of sexual attraction in cross-sex friendships. This common conception leads a small percentage of the population to believe that men and women cannot exist in solely platonic friendships.

=== The glass partition ===
Kim Elsesser and Letitia Anne Peplau found that the professional workplace environment and heightened sexual harassment awareness can hinder cross-sex friendship formation. The barrier between men and women forming cross-sex friendships in the professional workplace is called the "glass partition" because of its similarities to the glass ceiling, which prevents women from reaching the top levels of leadership of corporations. The glass partition disadvantages women who work in predominantly male workplaces because women have fewer opportunities for networking. The glass partition results from fearing that friendliness toward a cross-sex friend will be misinterpreted by the friend and by co-workers as romantic or sexual interest, that humor may be perceived as sexual harassment by cross-sex friends, and that conversational topics might be perceived as offensive by cross-sex friends.

When coworkers or other third parties see a cross-sex friendship in the workplace as romantic, this relationship is often viewed negatively, hurting both the male and female worker. This concern becomes specifically prevalent when dealing with cross-sex friendships between superiors and subordinates. It is more likely that this relationship can be misconstrued as often the subordinate, usually a female, might be seen as trying to make advances in order to further their career.

Sexual harassment can hinder the development of cross-sex friendships as well. It is typical practice in companies and organizations to have policies against sexual harassment and to conduct trainings regarding sexual harassment. Due to this heightened awareness of sexual harassment occurrences, many individuals will step back from cross-sex friendships as they can sometimes be misinterpreted by the opposite sex individual or bystanders as sexual harassment. In the study conducted by Elsesser and Peplau, it was stated that most men interviewed in their study often think over conversation topics before initiating conversation with women coworkers, in fear that their comments would be misinterpreted as sexual harassment. In the cases of such wrong accusations, many would rather avoid the possibility of such a situation through avoiding the development of cross-sex friendships as opposed to deal with the possible misconceptions.

Furthermore, it has been reported that oftentimes for men, there is a fear of offending the opposite sex regarding certain conversation topics. For instance, a male management consultant interviewed by Elsesser and Peplau stated that he commonly segregates by gender what type of jokes or humor he expresses in the workplace in fear that it might offend a female coworker. On the contrary, women often say that while they do not feel as though they censor their conversation as much, they can often sense such reservations and unwillingness to relax in men, making friendships awkward and harder to develop.

The fear to create cross-sex friendships in the workplace becomes a problem as friendships amongst coworkers can be specifically important for career development. Friendships can provide information access, networking and emotional support to any individual all of which are valuable for job performance. Hence, when one is limited to forming friendships with those of the same sex, certainly, they are being deprived of advancement in the workplace.

== Major empirical findings ==
Research has been done in the areas of attraction, protection, perception, cross-sex friendships throughout development, and touch and sexual activity between cross-sex friends. These studies find that there are some evolutionary and social benefits to cross-sex friendships. However, there are also some negative social consequences.

=== Attraction ===
Within cross-sex friendships, men judge sexual attraction and the desire for sex as a more important reason than do women for initiating their friendship. Additionally, men are more sexually attracted to their opposite-sex friends and have more frequent desires to have sexual intercourse with their opposite-sex friends than women are. Bleske-Rechek et al. found that men overestimate how much their female friends are attracted to them. Women are less likely to want to date their male friend if he is in a committed relationship, but men have the same desire to date their female friend whether or not she is dating someone. They hypothesize that a man's desire to date his female friend is not changed by whether or not their female friend is in a relationship. This is due to males' mating strategies that focus on acquiring short term mates. Furthermore, they suggest that men would pursue cross-sex friendships both when single and in a relationship, while women would be less likely to pursue cross-sex friends while dating someone.

Attraction within these friendships can cause challenges. Sexual attraction can arise for a variety of reasons in cross-sex friendships. In a study by Halatsis and Christakis, participants cited social pressures and emotional vulnerability as reasons for sexual attraction arising in a cross-sex friendship. A social pressure that may prompt sexual attraction between cross-sex friends is the perceptions other friends have of their relationship, and emotional vulnerability coupled with closeness may provoke sexual attraction between cross-sex friends. When sexual attraction develops in a friendship, it can corrupt the friendship and individuals state that behavior often changes. Sexual attraction in cross-sex friendships is often dealt with in one of three ways: management of this attraction through communication or an internal decision not to pursue the attraction in order to preserve the friendship, a sexual relationship forms then dissipates, or sex becomes a part of the friendship. When participants in the study by Halatsis and Christakis were asked about their experience with sexual attraction in cross-sex friendships, over 50% had experienced attraction, and over 50% of that group had expressed or acted on their sexual attraction. However, men had a tendency to be more attracted to their cross-sex friends, and a higher tendency to act on that attraction. Only 16% of individuals who had acted on their sexual attraction claimed that their friendship ended as a result, otherwise the friendship remained intact or transformed into a romantic relationship.

Reeder found that there are four types of attraction within cross-sex friendships: subjective physical/sexual attraction, objective physical/sexual attraction, romantic attraction, and friendship attraction. Subjective physical/sexual attraction occurs when one of the individuals in the friendship is physically attracted to the other. Objective physical/sexual attraction happens when one individual thinks that the other is attractive in general, yet they are not attracted to the person. Romantic attraction within the cross-sex friendship occurs when one of the individuals within the friendship desires to turn the friendship into a romantic relationship because they believe he or she would make a good girlfriend or boyfriend. Friendship attraction is simply when an individual feels very platonically connected to his or her friend. The four types can coexist together within a friendship or can occur separately. Furthermore, the type of attraction that an individual feels within a cross-sex friendship can change over time. Within Reeder's sample, friendship attraction is the most prevalent type of attraction within cross-sex friendships. Even when participants felt other types of attraction within their cross-sex friendships, they prioritized their friendship attraction so that the relationship would not be ruined.

=== Protection ===
Historically, women have been more vulnerable due to their smaller stature and lesser strength, on average, compared with men. Thus, women have consistently needed to secure protection for themselves. Seeking protection from men would have been an evolutionary advantage as women who do so increase their reproductive success, which has caused an evolved preference for men who are willing and able to offer protection. Therefore, it is not surprising that Bleske-Rechek & Buss found that women judged physical protection as a more important reason for initiating an opposite-sex friendship than did men and that opposite-sex friendship is a strategy women use for gaining physical protection.

In this regard, males have historically been perceived as having an advantage in cross-sex friendships because the number of resources they have to offer in the relationship exceeds those of females. In terms of exchange principles within the friendship, women would benefit more than men, while women may enter into cross-sex friendships for protection, men may enter them for the possibility of sexual encounters. These interactions are desirable because men get to spread their genes through potential offspring. In return, females can benefit from this type of cross-sex friendship through their friend's interest in potential offspring. In this regard, the men within these cross-sex friendships would devote time and energy to caring for and protecting their potential children, which would be beneficial to the females in these relationships. Therefore, in cross-sex friendships, it has been discovered that males are commonly the ones more interested in initiating romantic relationships due to their potential benefits, as observed in a survey of male and female college students.

=== Children's and adolescents' cross-sex friendships ===
Cross-sex friendships in childhood and adolescence often have an immense impact on adult cross-sex friendships. Successfully forming cross-sex friendships in childhood is often an indication that these individuals will be able to form positive cross-sex friendships later in life. Thus, early cross-sex friendships act as a blueprint for further social interactions. Children's social skills and behavior can be altered based on whether or not they have predominantly same-sex friends or cross-sex friends. One study by Kovacs, Parker, and Hoffman, they found that children who primarily had friends of the opposite sex were perceived to be more aggressive, yet less shy by others. Furthermore, teachers said that the children with primarily friends of the opposite sex had lower academic performance and social skills, but faced less stereotyping in regards to gender roles and were better adjusted to their social atmosphere than children with few friends in general. Results from Kovacs, Parker, and Hoffman's study show that children who have a best friend that is the opposite sex have poorer social functioning abilities. Yet, when children have friends primarily of the same sex, but some cross-sex friendships, they tend to be more well-adjusted and have stronger social skills. Additional studies conducted by Bell and Kalmijn oppose these negative observations behind cross-sex friendships in children, concluding that cross-sex friendships help children overcome communication barriers with the opposite sex, granting them an advantage with their social and communication skills later on. Their studies also observed that cross-sex friendships in children incorporate stronger senses of nurturance and intimacy that lack in same-sex friendships.

Cross-sex friendships in adolescence are very different than in childhood. In adolescence, cross-sex friendships are not only more accepted by peers, but also can increase an individual's social status among same-sex peers. A study on adolescents in 6th through 8th grade conducted by Malow-Iroff discovered that adolescents often use the creation of cross-sex friends as a road to popularity because children with both cross-sex and same-sex friends are more accepted by both sexes. Adolescents mainly look for cross-sex friends who are sociable, as they expect less from these friendships as they do from same-sex friends. Another study by Ami Flam Kuttler, Annette M. La Greca, and Mitchell J Prinstein surveyed 223 students from grades 10 through 12. The study concluded that although the number of cross-sex friendships in adolescents increase with age, both girls and boys felt a sense of stronger companionship and prosocial support with their friends of the same sex. However, adolescent boys claimed they felt as if their female companions provide support in regards to self-esteem more so than males. In addition to these findings, the study concluded that adolescents with predominately cross-sex friendships at these ages is perceived in relation to a lower social acceptance, rather than attaining to social or behavioral complications as observed in children through middle childhood.

=== Touch and sexual activity in cross-sex friendships ===
In cross-sex friendships, Miller, Denes, Diaz, and Ranjit found that when men believe the friendship to be strictly platonic, they are more open to touching their friend. However, when they think intimacy may be increasing in the relationship, they are less likely to desire casual touching. In contrast, the opposite was discovered to be true when it comes to women. Miller et al., found that women report being more uncomfortable if touched by their cross-sex friend in a public situation than men did. When there is touch between cross-sex friends, no matter how much intimacy is involved in the friendship, men tend to be more aroused by the touch than women are. The researchers hypothesize that the research results may have been confounded by a social desirability bias because women may be less likely to admit arousal from the touch of a cross-sex friend out of fear of being negatively labeled by others.

Afifi and Faulkner investigated instances in which individuals had sexual interactions with their platonic cross-sex friends. 51% of their sample had sex with their friend when they had no intention of pursuing a romantic relationship with them, and 34% of participants noted having sexual relations with their friend on multiple occasions. Within Afifi & Faulkner's study, of those who had sex with their friend, two-thirds stated that it improved their relationship and 56% stated that the relationship did not develop into something romantic.

Sexual interactions are recognized as a possible outcome of cross-sex friendships. In the face of these sexual overtones, some welcome the sexual tension in their cross-sex friendship while others note that the potential intimacy could destroy their relationship. With the sexual component, some friends are hesitant to enter into romantic relationships due to the anticipated disapproval of their social network of peers. Cross-sex friends often have overlapping social circles. Each member in the cross-sex friendship depends on their social network for support and other emotional needs. Thus, potentially falling out of touch with members of one's own social network if the romantic relationship did not work out is too costly a risk for some cross-sex friends, even if they have engaged in sexual interactions.

== Historical novelty ==
There have only been scattered ethnographic references to cross-sex friendships across cultures. Therefore, for most of human history, cross-sex friendships were probably not common. Today, men and women interact in non-romantic, supportive ways in all types of contexts: work, sports, education, and hobbies, yet these unions are not based on sexual intentions. Evolved mating strategies were mentioned earlier and can be dovetailed with this biological history.

== Controversies ==
Participants in cross-sex friendships face many challenges, including learning how to navigate the particular type of friendship. The four types of cross-sex friendship as defined by Guerrero and Chavez referenced earlier are: strictly platonic, mutual romance, desires romance, and rejects romance. In addition, O'Meara originally stated that the four essential challenges cross-sex friends face are:

1. Determining the type of emotional bond experienced in the relationship.
2. Confronting the issue of sexuality.
3. Dealing with the issue of relationship equality within a cultural context of gender inequality.
4. The challenge of public relationships — presenting the relationship as authentic to relevant audiences.

Schnoonover built research upon O'Meara's audience challenge and found that members of Guerrero and Chavez's different friendship types may experience challenges differently. For example, for "mutual romance" couples, members may be approaching the preliminary romantic stage of the relationship and if their romantic feelings feed into their behaviors toward each other, then they will be the most likely to be mistaken for a romantic couple. In contrast, "strictly platonic" friends should be the least likely to prompt the audience challenge. "Desires romance" and "rejects romance" couples may also be subject to the audience challenge — if observers of the friendship see the member acting in a romantic manner or admitting romantic intent, the observers might be more likely to regard the cross-sex friendship as a growing romantic relationship more so than a friendship.

When looking at how men and women's same-sex relationships work, men tend to talk about more of their problems and open up more with women, rather than their other male friendships, which tends to facilitate a bit of a gray area of what is expected when a man and a woman are friends. Cross-sex friendship can exist after marriage when the married couple transition out of the passionate phase. Original feelings while dating are feelings of passion and what many describe as love, however as the relationship progresses through the years and into marriage, studies have found these feelings to be diminished and transition into more of a friendship. This is a topic of controversy as some argue it cannot be labeled as a cross-sex "friendship" but rather a romantic relationship, however a study by Alan Booth and Elaine Hess dictates that almost all cross-sex friendships can have some sexual/romantic influence, however it does not discount the friendship. The "friend zone" has also focused on the argument that two people of opposite sexes can never be friends, and many saying that no friendship can occur after one party has made it evident that they have romantic feelings for the other. This coincides with questions on if the parties involved can have had or currently have romantic feelings for one another, or if a friendship must be based on solely feelings of platonic friendship for the duration of the friendship. The definition of a cross-sex friendship that J. Donald O'Meara gives is a relationship between a man and a woman that is not primarily focused on romance, but is not always void of romantic feelings, meaning that once one party had been in the "friend zone" as long as the relationship is primarily aimed towards a friendship, it is still a cross-sex friendship.

Researchers in child development psychology, more specifically a study done by Donna M. Kovacs, Jeffrey G. Parker and Lois W. Hoffman, looked into children's cross-sex friendships, and found an absence of these types of friendships at younger ages. This raised cause for concern within the study as the researchers discussed how this could be due to a greater separation of genders at younger ages, which can reinforce societal defined gender roles, and prevent these types of friendships, which can be beneficial to development, from occurring.

== See also ==
- Committed relationship
- Heterosociality
- Human bonding
- Romantic friendship
- Same-sex intimacy
- Sex differences in psychology
