= Male bonding =

Close personal relationship between men

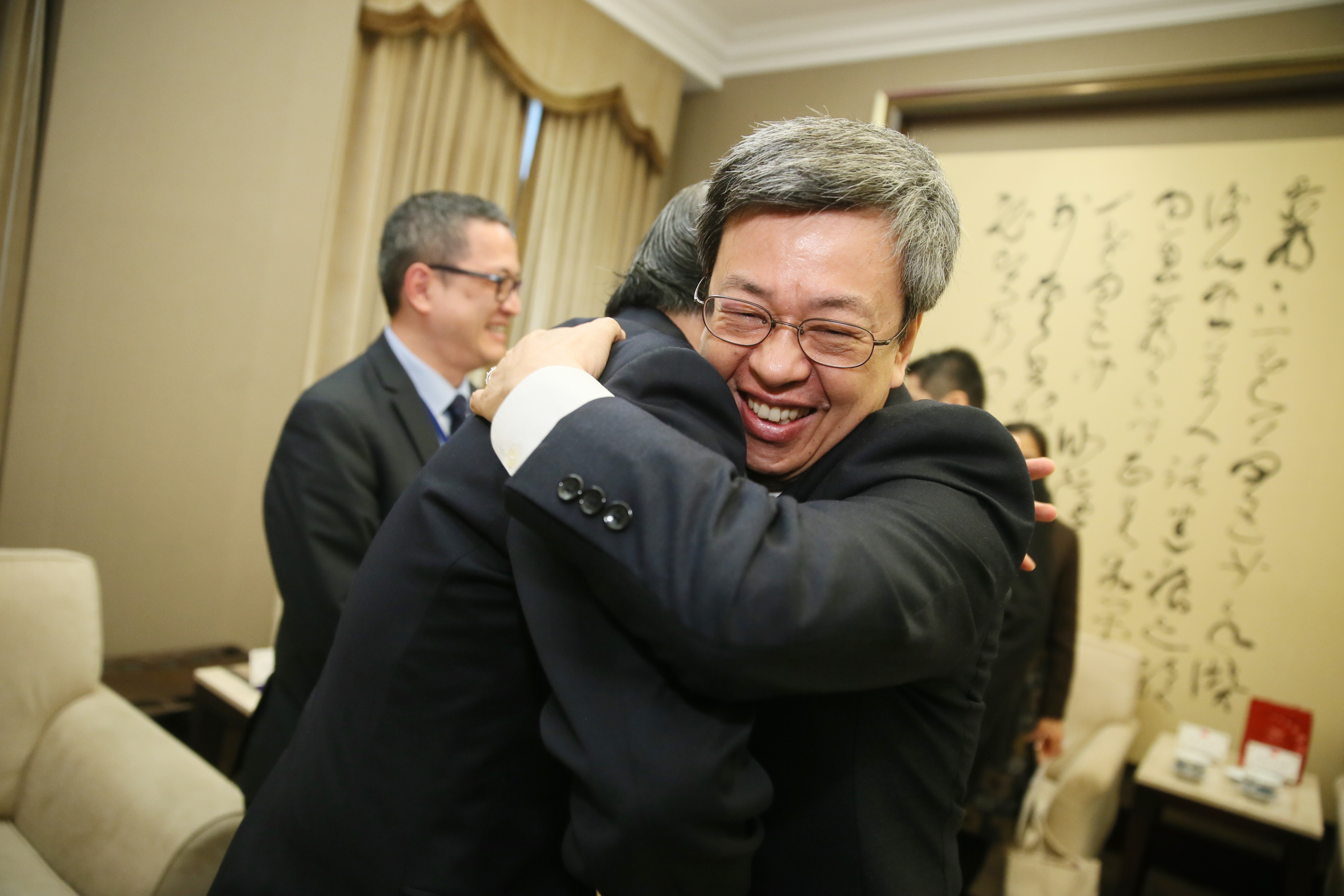
Vice President Chen shares a hug with Dr. Andy Shih, Taiwan, 2017

In ethology and social science, male bonding or male friendship is the formation of close personal relationships, and patterns of friendship or cooperation between males. Male bonding is a form of homosociality, or social connection between individuals of the same gender. Male bonding can occur through various contexts and activities that build emotional closeness, trust, and camaraderie. Male bonding is an important feature of men's social functioning and can provide benefits including emotional support and intimacy, shared identity, and personal fulfillment contributing to men's mental health and wellbeing.

Though male bonding and male friendships have been researched in contexts of anthropology, psychology, and sociology, overall male bonding remains understudied.

== Characteristics ==
Male bonding can take various forms and may be expressed differently across cultures and individual relationships. Common characteristics of male bonding include:

Shared activities: Men often bond through participation in common activities such as sports, or hobbies. These activities provide an environment for cooperation, competition, and shared experiences, all of which can help strengthen social ties.

Emotional support: Though men's friendships are often stereotyped as surface level and consisting of less intimacy, more recent studies have found that men today both value and engage in intimacy in their friendships more than men in previous generations.

Rituals and traditions: Many male groups engage in social rituals that help cement their relationships. These can range from informal traditions, like watching sports together, to more formal rites of passage such as fraternity initiations. Such traditions have also been criticized as promoting hegemonic masculinity.

== Male bonding across the lifespan ==
=== Early childhood (age 2–6) ===
In early childhood, male bonding begins primarily within the family structure. For young boys, bonding often centers around interactions with fathers, or other male relatives. These early connections help children develop trust and emotional security.

There is research evidence from studies of children in school settings that preschool aged children are more likely to select same-sex playmates, rather than playmates of the other sex, when able to self-select playmates. There is also evidence that very young boys and girls differ in emotional expressiveness in dyadic friendships. Young boys often begin to seek out and enjoy time with other boys around this age, especially as they begin to recognize gender as a part of their identity.

=== School-age children (age 6–12) ===
As children enter school, their social world expands beyond the family, and peer relationships become increasingly important. Male bonding in this phase is shaped by shared interests, group activities, and a developing sense of identity. Boys begin to form more structured friendships, typically based on shared activities. These early friendships lay the groundwork for later emotional and social development. Research suggests that during this phase, children often begin to segregate into same-gender groups, with boys forming strong bonds with other boys.

=== Adolescence (age 12–22) ===
Adolescence is a period of significant social, emotional, and physical development, and peer relations become more complex and takes on new dimensions as young boys navigate the challenges of puberty and identity formation.

Friendship is important for adolescent mental health and in early adolescence male friendships tend to become more intimate with higher value placed on self-disclosure, reciprocity, loyalty, and commitment. Friendship networks at this age tend to include both same and other gender peers as interests in romantic relationships begins to emerge, though gender segregation remains prominent across dyadic friendships.

In adolescence, cultural pressure for boys to conform to masculine ideals tends to increase which has led many to theorize that boys have fewer intimate friendships in adolescence and adulthood. Some researchers have found that in early adolescence boys often have very loving and intimate relationships with same-gender best friends, but that this intimacy wanes over time with men becoming more disconnected from their friendships in later adolescence, despite stated desires for intimacy. In some studies, men in college report less instances of sharing personal information with male friends including thoughts, feelings, attitudes, and self-disclosures compared to what they shared with female friends. However, more recent literature suggests that college age men tend to be less limited by traditional views of masculinity and homosocial bonding than previous generations and are more intimate and emotionally expressive in their same gender friendships.

During adolescence, boys often bond through risk-taking behaviors, such as experimenting with substances, engaging in rebellious acts, or pushing physical limits. This creates a shared sense of adventure and camaraderie but can also have negative consequences if the behaviors are dangerous.

=== Young adulthood (age 22–30) and middle adulthood (age 30–60) ===
Relatively little research has explored male bonding and male friendships in adulthood. Young adulthood is marked by increased independence and the establishment of long-term goals, such as career ambitions, romantic relationships, and starting families. Male bonding during this stage often revolves around shared life transitions, professional development, and personal challenges.

In adulthood, more emphasis begins to be placed on social roles and responsibilities such as increased focus on career, family, and personal development which can impact the amount of time men spend bonding with friends. However, strong male friendships remain vital, as they offer support in navigating the complexities of adulthood and help men maintain a sense of identity. Men's friendship networks during this time often include work and professional contacts.

=== Older adulthood (age 60+) ===
Though much research shows friendship in old age is psychologically beneficial, as with other adult age groups, there is very little research on gender differences in friendships later in life. Factors that may impact male bonding in older adults include loss of friends, health issues, and social isolation. In addition to experiencing friendship loss due to death, as men retire, their friendships may deplete due to loss of contact with friends they previously engaged with regularly in work or networking settings.

== Male bonding and gender norms ==
For the past several decades, the social sciences have defined hegemonic masculinity by attributes such as strength, independence, and emotional restraint. These norms have often discouraged men from forming emotionally intimate relationships or expressing vulnerability and have resulted in homohysteria. Men within the LGBTQ+ community often face stigma and exclusion due to non-normative gender identities and sexual orientations. For these individuals, experiences of male bonding are influenced by experiences of marginalization, discrimination, and the complexities of navigating social identities. Gay, bisexual, and queer men may struggle to find acceptance within male spaces that emphasize homophobia or rigid masculinity, such as in sport.

More recent research has shown that younger men are more likely to include gay peers in friendship groups. A new theory of masculinity, called "Inclusive masculinity theory", has emerged to capture a societal decline in homophobia in western cultures and a theorized more inclusive version of masculinity.

For transgender men, the experience of male bonding is shaped by their intersectional identities as both transgender individuals and men. As they navigate gender transition and male socialization, they may face challenges in forming male bonds. Transgender men may encounter exclusion from men in male-dominated spaces such as locker rooms or sports teams.

== Male bonding in contemporary Western media ==
Male bonding has been a common theme in Western media for many decades, often depicted in ways that reinforce traditional notions of masculinity and friendship. Shows such as Dave and Ted Lasso have presented male friendships that are characterized by emotional support, vulnerability, and deeper connections beyond shared activities.

=== "Bromance" ===
The term "bromance" has emerged in recent years to describe a close, non-romantic friendship between men that involves a heightened level of emotional intimacy and affection. The bromance has gained prominence in Western media, particularly in films and television. Unlike traditional representations of male friendships, which often emphasize masculine stereotypes, the bromance focuses on the positive emotional aspects of male bonding.

Though initially thought of as media trope, the bromance has become a more positive and inclusive representation of male relationships that allows men to express care for each other, both verbally and physically, in ways that defy traditional masculine norms, such as hugging, openly expressing affection, or discussing emotions.

=== "Locker room talk" ===
"Locker room talk" is informal, often crude conversations that men engage in, typically in private settings such as locker rooms, bars, or among male peers. This style of conversation is often characterized by humor, bravado, and an emphasis on male sexuality, dominance, and sometimes, objectification of women. Locker room talk has become a cultural trope associated with toxic masculinity that reflects broader societal critiques of masculinity and male bonding.

These conversations have gained more scrutiny and attention in both popular culture and the media in recent years following the 2016 U.S. presidential election, when a recording of Donald Trump casually bragging about sexually assaulting women to a television personality was leaked to the public. Following the tape being leaked, Trump attempted to dismiss public concern by stating the remarks were "locker room talk". The incident sparked widespread discussions about the impact of such talk on societal attitudes toward women and the role it plays in reinforcing a culture of toxic masculinity.

=== Recession in male friendship ===
The "male friendship crisis" refers to a growing concern that men, particularly in Western societies, are increasingly isolated from close, emotionally intimate friendships. The American male friendship recession has been reported on by news outlets including The New York Times, PBS, Psychology Today, and Vox.

Surveys have shown that men are experiencing a decline in the number of meaningful friendships they maintain, with the number of men reporting having at least 6 close friends halving in 2021 compared to 1990. Many men have reported feeling lonely or disconnected from others. This phenomenon is often attributed to cultural norms that encourage men to hide vulnerability and is thought to have been accelerated by societal shifts in the wake of the COVID-19 pandemic such as social isolating during the pandemic and resulting increases in remote work arrangements.

== See also ==
- Biology of human bonding
