= Childhood sweetheart =

Phrase for a relationship between young people

Childhood sweetheart is a reciprocating phrase for a relationship (but not a partnership) between young persons. This may come about by an extension of friendship, physical attraction, or from natural affinity.

The relationship is usually platonic and lasts a short to medium period of time. This experience forms the basis of subsequent future relationships later in childhood and/or adulthood. Usually, an individual will have no more than one childhood sweetheart as this term is indicative of a milestone in the growth, development and maturity of a young person. In ideal circumstances, the term applies mutually to both parties and corresponds both ways, hence the plural being childhood sweethearts.

The relationship may involve romantic love or may be an extension of a close friendship. Often, intimacy will be displayed by way of kissing, hugging, cuddling, holding hands, and other such affectionate acts. The term "first love" may also apply in certain situations.

Occasionally in later years, these friendships are "rekindled" following separations or passing of their adult partners, which may lead to marriage or another union later in life. Some of these instances have been made popular by media coverage.

== See also ==
- Courtship
- Dating
- Friendship
- Infatuation
- Limerence
- Puppy love
- Romantic friendship
