= Consoling touch =

Pro-social behavior

Consoling touch is a pro-social behavior involving physical contact between a distressed individual and a caregiver. The physical contact, most commonly recognized in the form of a hand hold or embrace, is intended to comfort one or more of the participating individuals. Consoling touch is intended to provide consolation - to alleviate or lessen emotional or physical pain. This type of social support has been observed across species and cultures. Studies have found little difference in the applications of consoling touch, with minor differences in frequency occurrence across cultures. These findings suggest a degree of universality. It remains unclear whether the relationship between social touch and interpersonal emotional bonds reflect biologically driven or culturally normative behavior. Evidence of consoling touch in non-human primates, who embrace one another following distressing events, suggest a biological basis. Numerous studies of consoling touch in humans and animals unveil a consistent physiological response. An embrace from a friend, relative, or even stranger can trigger the release of oxytocin, dopamine, and serotonin into the bloodstream. These neurotransmitters are associated with positive mood, numerous health benefits, and longevity. Cortisol, a stress hormone, also decreases. Studies have found that the degree of intimacy and quality of relationship between consoler and the consoled mediates physiological effects. In other words, while subjects experience reduced cortisol levels while holding the hand of a stranger, they exhibit a larger effect when receiving comfort from a trusted friend, and greater still, when holding the hand of a high quality romantic partner.

== Contact and development ==
The importance of consoling touch was first explored by Harry Frederick Harlow. From 1950 through 1970, Harlow conducted controversial research on rhesus monkeys observing maladaptation resulting from maternal-separation and social isolation. Infant monkeys were separated from their biological mothers and given two inanimate surrogate mothers. Cheekily referred to as 'Iron Maidens', the first of the two surrogates was constructed of wire and contained a feeding mechanism. The second contained no food and was constructed of rubber and soft terrycloth. In all variations of the paradigm the infants spent significantly more time clinging to the cloth mother. Only when the monkeys were hungry did they leave the terrycloth, only to return to it after eating. Monkeys accompanied by iron maidens behaved differently in novel environments than those in complete isolation. When chaperoned by a surrogate mother monkeys explored new environments, retreated to the surrogate when startled, only to continue exploring thereafter. Monkeys put in novel environments without an iron maiden cowered in the nearest corner, too fearful to explore. Those raised in complete isolation developed marked disturbed behavior such as pacing in cages, staring blankly, and self-mutilation. When introduced to other rhesus's, those raised in isolation did not socialize, kept separate from the group, and refused to eat. Harlow rehabilitated socially inept monkeys by enclosing them with a non-threatening, well socialized other. Harlow observed these social pair interactions, calling them "the isolate and the therapist'. Upon introduction, the isolate huddled in a corner. The therapist reacted by embracing the isolate. With consoling touch and modeling of social interaction, isolates were indistinguishable from therapists after one year. Harlow concluded that social rehabilitation is possible, however there may be a critical period, much like language development in humans. The need for close comforting physical contact became known as contact comfort. Contact comfort is believed to be the foundation of attachment and serves as the basis for consoling touch.

Extensive research has documented the importance of physical touch in human emotional and physical wellbeing. From a developmental perspective touch plays a vital role in infants' physical and cortical growth, stress relief, and secure attachment formation. Nurturing touch is positively associated with children's neuronal development thus determining the trajectory of their behavioral and cognitive growth. Though no laboratory studies exist due to ethical considerations, data emphasizing the necessity of consoling touch was taken from orphanages where the caretaker to child ratio was 1:25. Children deficient in consoling touch during critical developmental stages had between 20%-30% less brain mass than children of similar age who received sufficient socialization. In a 1997 study, Dawson et al. monitored the neural functioning of children born to depressed mothers. A key symptom of maternal depression is reduced social touch between mother and child. The electroencephalogram (EEG) results of children with depressed mothers had markedly reduced activity in the left frontal lobe. The abnormality remained consistent with the mother's condition throughout the duration of the three-year study. The children of mothers who managed to diminish depressive symptoms before their child's first year later developed a more normal brain pattern. The likelihood of full neural recovery lessens as a child ages due to sensitive periods for brain development, the first year and a half being the most critical.

== Pain mitigation ==
=== Physical ===
From a therapeutic perspective consoling touch provides pain alleviation and facilitates healing. In a 1993 study of young adults undergoing chemotherapy, hand holding was rated to be a significantly effective coping strategy in ameliorating treatment-related pain. Overwhelmingly, patients preferred to hold the hand of a close relative or partner. Consoling touch functioned to reduce anxiety associated with impending treatments and served as a source of security. Patient's subjective experience of treatment-related pain was significantly reduced when they felt more secure, less tense, and had social support. Marshall Klaus's 1995 work demonstrated the power of social touch in labour and delivery. He found women receiving consoling touch during delivery had reduced labour duration, reported less anxiety and physical pain, and had reduced need for caesarean section.

Numerous studies have been conducted exploring pain mitigation and consoling touch between romantic partners. From electric shocks to temperatures too hot for touch, holding the hand of a loved one decreases physical pain perception. In 2018 couples were brought into a lab and administered mild heat pain while undergoing EEG. Not only were pain ratings significantly reduced in the hand holding condition, couples exhibited what is known as brain-to-brain coupling, or neural synchrony. This means neural firing, both topographically and temporally, matches that of another party. This mechanism is hypothesized to be an integral feature of empathy and shared experience. Neural synchrony is most easily detected in couples during shared experience, such as laughter. Importantly, social touch nor neural synchrony are analgesics. Consoling touch can reduce pain perception, but not eliminate it entirely.

=== Emotional ===
Recent research has shown that consoling touch modulates emotional responses as well as physical. In a 2019 study the neurobehavioral correlates of consoling touch were examined by showing participants photos of recently deceased relatives while undergoing functional magnetic resonance imaging (fMRI). Participant brain activity was monitored in two conditions, either in solitude, or while holding the hand of a significant other. Activation varied in several brain areas. Reduced reactivity was reported in the anterior cingulate cortex (ACC) and cerebellum in the hand-holding condition. The ACC has neural connections to both the limbic system, the emotional center, and the prefrontal cortex, known for higher cognitive function. The ACCs location, paired with numerous empirical studies, confirm its involvement in emotion and pain regulation. The cerebellum, located in the brainstem, is classically responsible for coordinating voluntary movements; however, recent work suggests it may play a role in emotional valence determination.

A similar fMRI experiment evaluated the neurological effects of viewing moderately disturbing images while holding the hand of a significant other. Connectivity between the anterior insula and the ACC decreased during partner touch. The anterior insula is known for emotional and olfactory appraisal with an observed focus on disgust. Decreased connectivity between these two regions in the hand holding condition suggest that consoling touch elicits a buffering effect.

== Affective versus discriminative touch ==
Consoling touch has an emotional component that utilizes different neural networks and nerves than physical sensation processing alone. This distinction has been described by studies examining discriminative touch versus affective touch. Discriminative touch conveys information regarding pressure, vibration, or stretching of the skin. This kind of processing involves type A nerve fibers, which relay information very quickly to the brains sensory regions. Affective touch, however, involves type C nerve fibers. Unmyelinated, slower traveling, type C nerves communicate pain signals, temperature, and social touch. In humans, type C nerves have the greatest response to soft strokes from stimuli matching skin temperature. These afferent nerves also exhibit a tuning curve for caressing speed specific to that which an individual finds most pleasant. The 'social touch hypothesis', coined by Håkan Olausson in 2010, proposes that C afferent nerve fibers are most sensitive to tactile stimuli occurring during close social interaction.

=== Patient G. L. ===
Much of the understanding of affective and discriminative touch can be attributed to a woman known as 'Patient G. L'. Patient G. L. had Guillain-Barré syndrome, a rare autoimmune disorder wherein an immune system attacks the body's own muscle and sensory neurons. Due to the condition, Patient G. L. lacked type A nerve fibers, while type C remained intact. Though the patient could not perceive physical contact, such as pressure on her skin, she still reported an emotional response to consoling touch. Further functional magnetic resonance imaging (fMRI) examination confirmed the patient lacked activation in the somatosensory cortex during touch.

Because the somatosensory cortex is responsible for type A processing, a healthy control would exhibit activation of these areas. Instead, patient G. L. showed heightened activation in the posterior insula. The posterior insula is not sensitive to visceral input, but is involved in recognition, intensity encoding, and reward assessment. Patient G. L. described being the recipient of social touch as "a faint, hard-to-place, pleasant sensation". Olausson, a professor of clinical neuroscience, has compiled a great deal of work on the somatosensory system. He has identified not only cases like Patient G. L., but her inverse. Numerous adults without type C nerve fibers, but with type A were identified and studied. FMRI data confirmed these patients exhibited activation of the somatosensory cortex with no firing of the posterior insula. These findings are some of the first to confirm C afferent nerve fibers convey emotional and social information involving the reward system while type A communicate tactile information within the somatosensory cortex.

== Individual differences ==
Individuals vary in their preference for consoling touch. It is speculated that culture and upbringing are the greatest determinants. Going beyond environmental factors, there is a notable relationship between tactile experience and the autism spectrum. 96% of individuals on the spectrum report an altered, and largely heightened, sensitivity to tactile input. These variations in nerve processing manifest in different ways, be it wearing very specific fabrics, or avoiding rain because the sensation of drops on the skin is painful. Kevin Pelphrey, a clinical neuroscientist at Yale, recently evaluated response to social touch in non-autistic and autistic children. Children had their arms gently grazed with a paint brush and had their palms touched by a caregiver while in an fMRI scanner. Non-autistic children elicited the expected response. There was heightened activation of C afferent nerves and the posterior insula in the palm touch condition while type A nerves responded to the paintbrush condition. The children on the Autism spectrum, however, elicited a similar neuronal response in both conditions with marked activation of the somatosensory cortex. The findings raise the possibility that individuals on the spectrum may not be extracting social information from touch. These findings are preliminary and cannot be used to assume individual preference or experience of social touch.

== See also ==
- Affective haptics
- Haptic communication
- Physical intimacy
- Social rejection
- Touch starvation
