= Affective haptics =

Systems influencing emotions by touch

Affective haptics is an area of research which focuses on the study and design of devices and systems that can elicit, enhance, or influence the emotional state of a human by means of the sense of touch. The research field is originated with the Dzmitry Tsetserukou and Alena Neviarouskaya papers on affective haptics and real-time communication system with rich emotional and haptic channels. Driven by the motivation to enhance social interactivity and emotionally immersive experience of users of real-time messaging, virtual, augmented realities, the idea of reinforcing (intensifying) own feelings and reproducing (simulating) the emotions felt by the partner was proposed. Four basic haptic (tactile) channels governing our emotions can be distinguished:

1. physiological changes (e.g., heart beat rate, body temperature, etc.)
2. physical stimulation (e.g., tickling)
3. social touch (e.g., hug, handshake)
4. emotional haptic design (e.g., shape of device, material, texture).

== Emotion theories ==
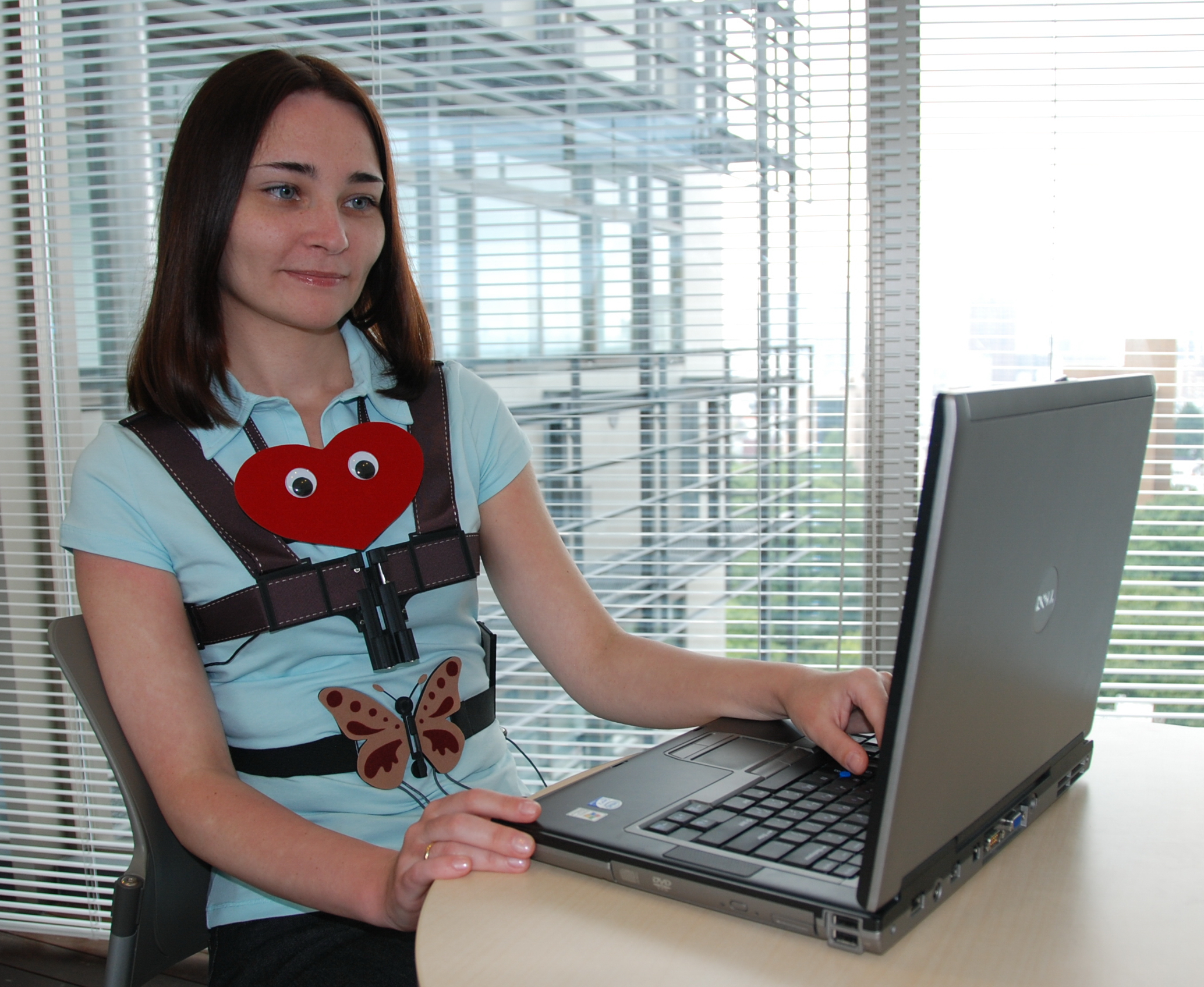
Affective haptic devices worn on a human body

According to James-Lange theory, the conscious experience of emotion occurs after the cortex receives signals about changes in physiological state. Researchers argued that feelings are preceded by certain physiological changes. Thus, when we see a venomous snake, we feel fear, because our cortex has received signals about our racing heart, knocking knees, etc. Damasio distinguishes primary and secondary emotions. Both involve changes in bodily states, but the secondary emotions are evoked by thoughts. Recent empirical studies support non-cognitive theories of nature of emotions. It was proven that we can easily evoke our emotions by something as simple as changing facial expression (e.g., smile brings on a feeling of happiness).

== Sense of touch in affective haptics ==
Human emotions can be easily evoked by different cues, and the sense of touch is one of the most emotionally charged channels. Affective haptic devices produce different senses of touch including kinesthetic and coetaneous channels. Kinesthetic stimulations, which are produced by forces exerted on the body, are sensed by mechanoreceptors in the tendons and muscles. On the other hand, mechanoreceptors in the skin layers are responsible for the perception of cutaneous stimulation. Different types of tactile corpuscles allow us sensing thermal property of the object, pressure, vibration frequency, and stimuli location.

== Technologies of affective haptics ==
=== Social touch ===
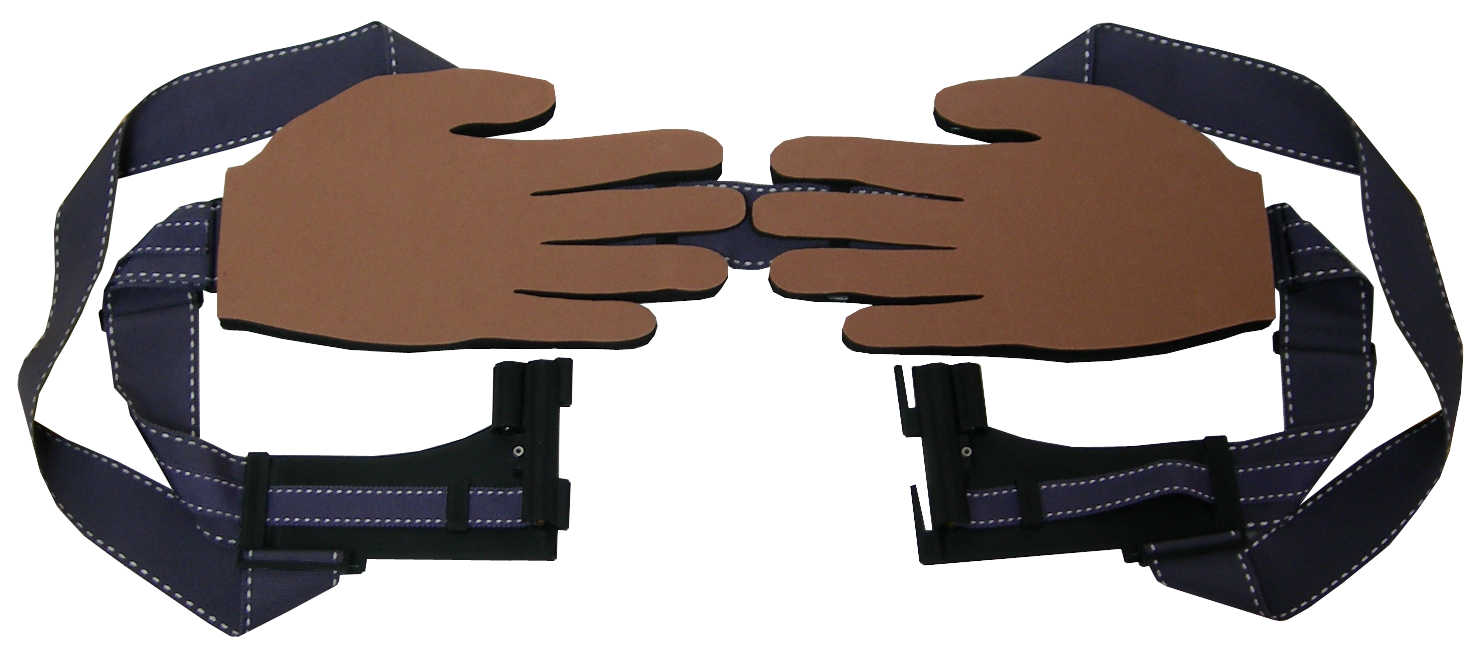
HaptiHug: haptic display for communication of hug over a distance

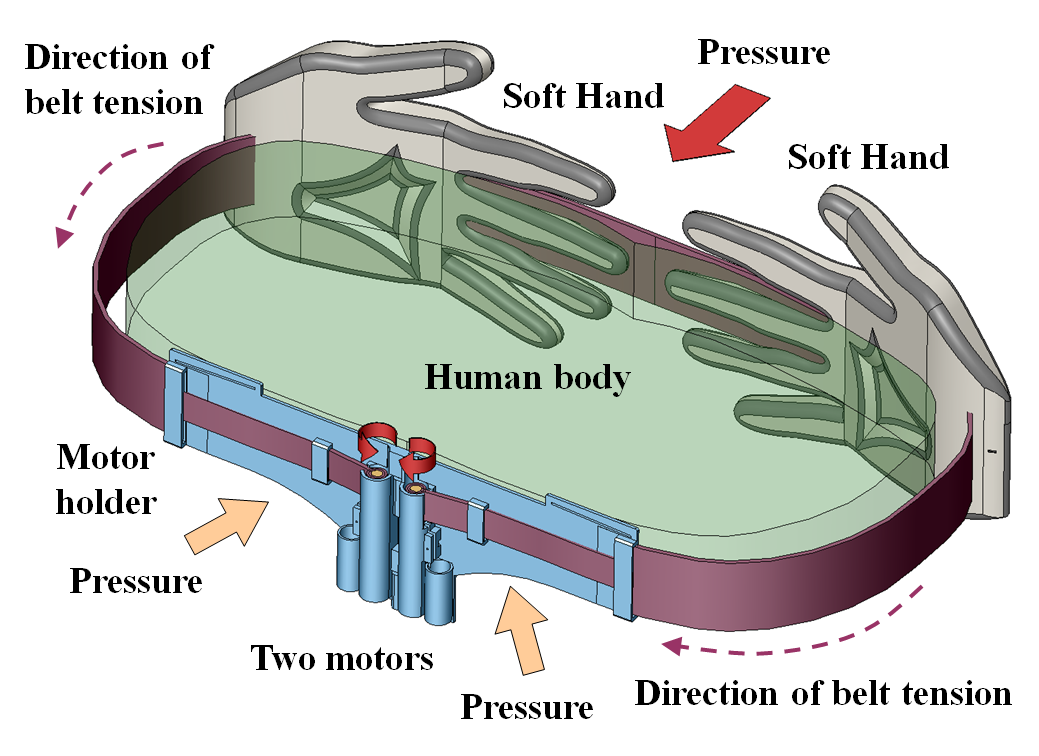
Structure of HaptiHug

Online interactions rely heavily on vision and hearing, so a substantial need exists for mediated social touch. Of the forms of physical contact, hugging is particularly emotionally charged; it conveys warmth, love, and affiliation. Recently, researchers have made several attempts to create a hugging device providing some sense of physical co-presence over a distance. HaptiHug's key feature is that it physically reproduces the human-hug pattern, generating pressure simultaneously on each user's chest and back. The idea to realistically reproduce hugging is in integration of active-haptic device HaptiHug and pseudo-haptic touch simulated by hugging animation. Thus, high immersion into the physical contact of partners while hugging is achieved.

=== Intimate touch ===
Affection goes further than hugging alone. People such as those who are single, socially isolated, or those in a long distance relationships are faced with a lack of physical intimacy on a day-to-day basis. Haptic technology allows for kinesthetic and tactile interface design. The field of digital co-presence envelops Teledildonics as well. The Kiiroo SVir is a good example of an Adult CyberToy that incorporates tactile input, by means of a surface that is touch capacitive, and an inside that is kinesthetic in nature. 12 rings contract, pulse and vibrate according to the movements one's partner makes in real time. The SVir mimics the actual motion of its OPue counterpart and is also compatible with other SVir models. The SVir enables women to have intercourse with their partner through use of the OPue interactive vibrator no matter how great the distance that separates the couple.

=== Implicit emotion elicitation ===
Different types of devices can be used to produce the physiological changes. Of the bodily organs, the heart plays a particularly important role in our emotional experience. The heart imitator HaptiHeart produces special heartbeat patterns according to emotion to be conveyed or elicited (sadness is associated with slightly intense heartbeat, anger with quick and violent heartbeat, fear with intense heart rate). False heart beat feedback can be directly interpreted as a real heart beat, so it can change the emotional perception. HaptiButterfly reproduces "butterflies in your stomach" (the fluttery or tickling feeling felt by people experiencing love) through arrays of vibration motors attached to the user's abdomen. HaptiShiver sends "shivers up and down your spine" through a row of vibration motors. HaptiTemper sends "chills up and down your spine" through both cold airflow from a fan and the cold side of a Peltier element. HaptiTemper is also intended for simulation of warmth on the human skin to evoke either pleasant feeling or aggression.

=== Explicit emotion elicitation ===
HaptiTickler directly evokes joy by tickling the user's ribs. It includes four vibration motors reproducing stimuli similar to human finger movements.

=== Affective (emotional) haptic design. ===
Recent findings show that attractive things make people feel good, which in turn makes them think more creatively. The concept of emotional haptic design was proposed. The core idea is to make user to feel an affinity for the device through:

- appealing shapes evoking the desire to touch and haptically explore them,
- material pleasurable to touch, and
- the anticipation of the pleasure of wearing the device.

=== Affective computing ===
Affective computing can be used to measure and to recognize emotional information in systems and devises employing affective haptics. Emotional information is extracted by using such techniques as speech recognition, natural language processing, facial expression detection, and measurement of physiological data.

== Potential applications ==
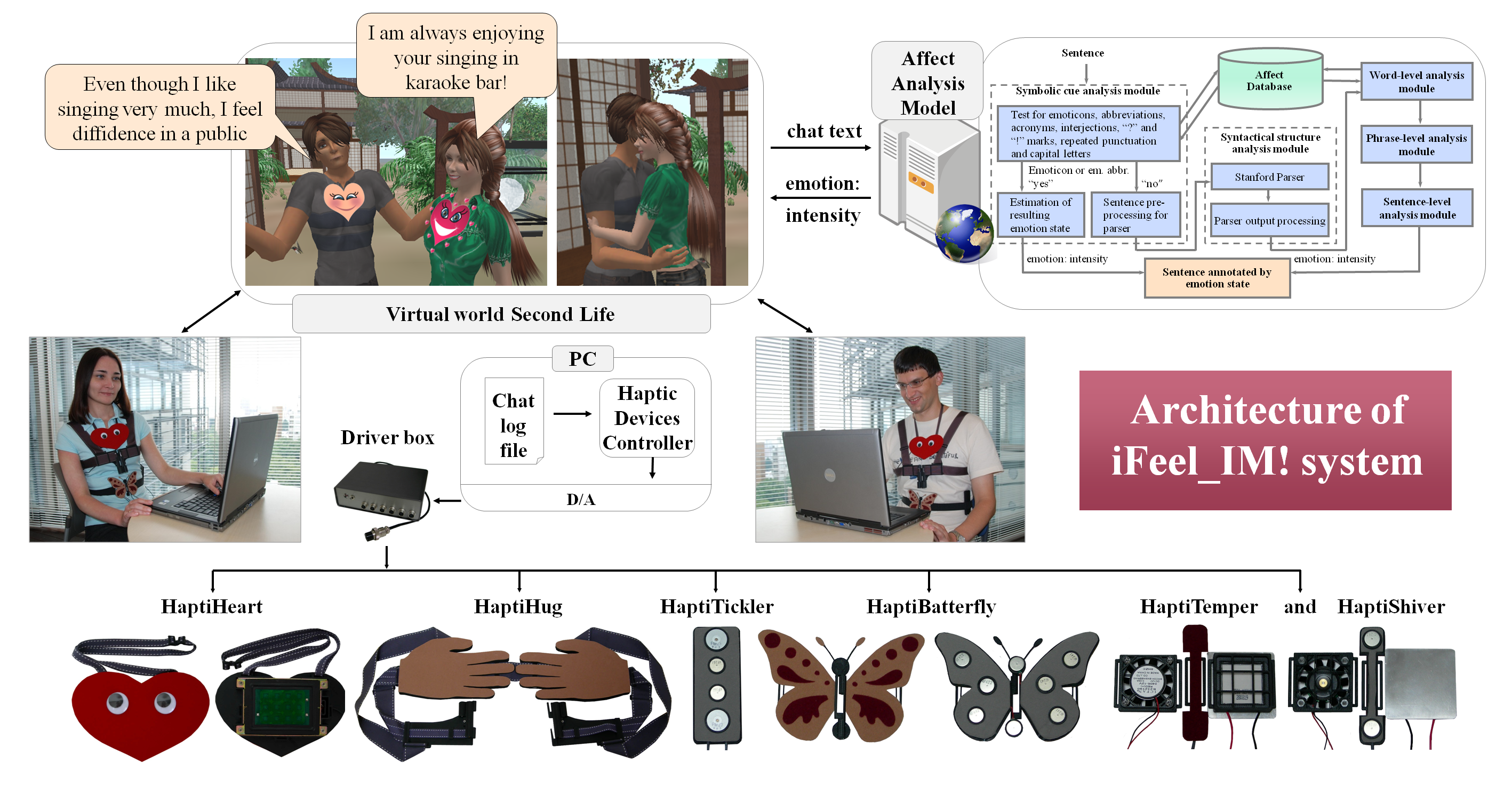
The iFeel_IM! architecture

Possible applications are as follows:

- treating depression and anxiety (problematic emotional states),
- controlling and modulating moods on the basis of physiological signals,
- affective and collaborative games,
- psychological testing,
- assistive technology and augmentative communication systems for children with autism.

Affective Haptics is in the vanguard of emotional telepresence, technology that lets users feel emotionally as if they were present and communicating at a remote physical location. The remote environment can be real, virtual, or augmented.

== Application examples ==
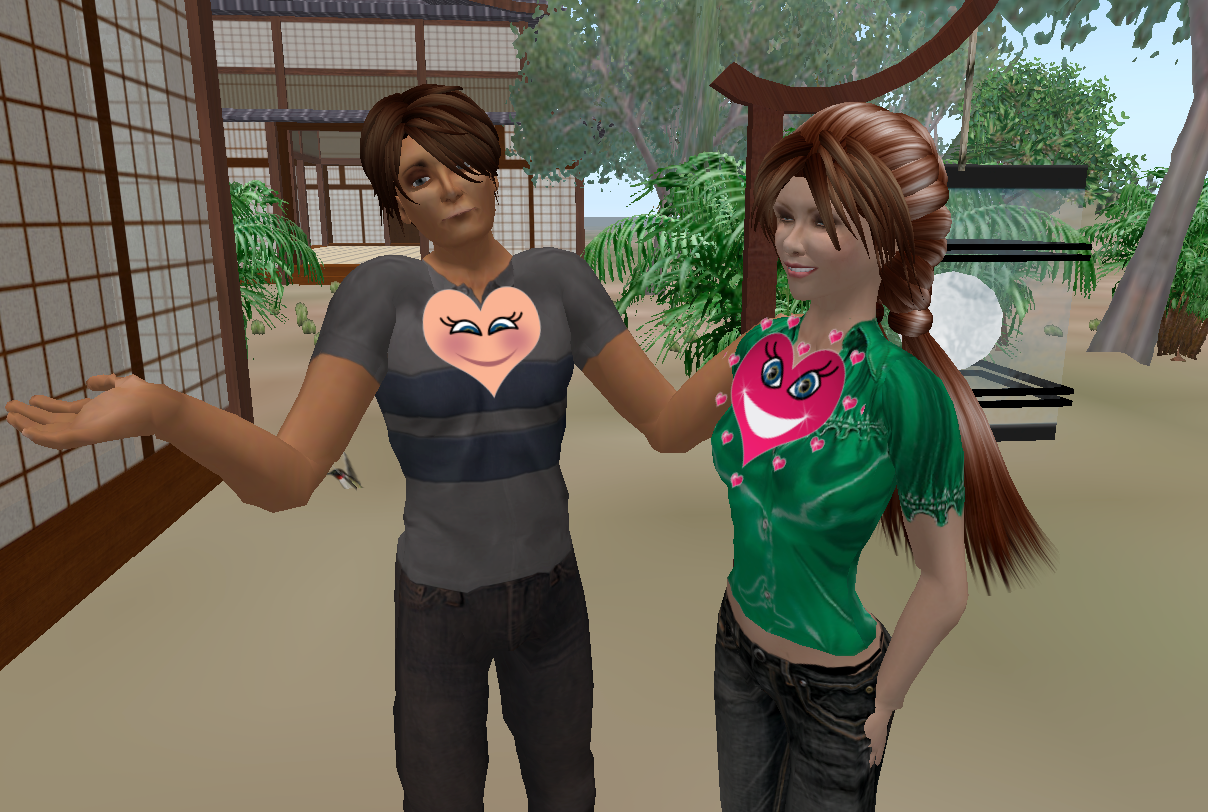
EmoHeart object on the avatars' chest vividly and expressively represents the communicated emotions

The philosophy behind the iFeel_IM! (intelligent system for Feeling enhancement powered by affect sensitive Instant Messenger) is "I feel [therefore] I am!". In the iFeel_IM! system, great importance is placed on the automatic sensing of emotions conveyed through textual messages in 3D virtual world Second Life (artificial intelligence), the visualization of the detected emotions by avatars in virtual environment, enhancement of user's affective state, and reproduction of feeling of social touch (e.g., hug) by means of haptic stimulation in a real world. The control of the conversation is implemented through the Second Life object called EmoHeart attached to the avatar's chest. In addition to communication with the system for textual affect sensing (Affect Analysis Model), EmoHeart is responsible for sensing symbolic cues or keywords of 'hug' communicative function conveyed by text, and for visualization of 'hugging' in Second Life. The iFeel_IM! system considerably enhance emotionally immersive experience of real-time messaging.

In order to build a social interface, Réhman et al. developed two tactile systems (i.e. mobile phone based and chair based) which could render human facial expression for visually impaired persons. These systems conveyed human emotions to visually impaired persons using vibrotactile stimuli.

To produce movie-specific tactile stimuli influencing the viewer's emotions to the viewer's body, the wearable tactile jacket was developed by Philips researchers. The motivation was to increase emotional immersion in a movie-viewing. The jacket contains 64 vibration motors that produce specially designed tactile patterns on the human torso.

== See also ==
- Artificial intelligence
- Consoling touch
- Haptic communication
- Haptic technology
- Nonverbal communication
- Social robot
- Somatosensory system
- Touch starvation
