= Cuddle time =

Cuddle time may refer to:

- Cuddle time (attachment therapy)
- Cuddle party, non-sexual group physical intimacy
- Cuddle Time, a programming segment on Tiny Pop
