= Side hug =

Display of affection involving embracing from the side

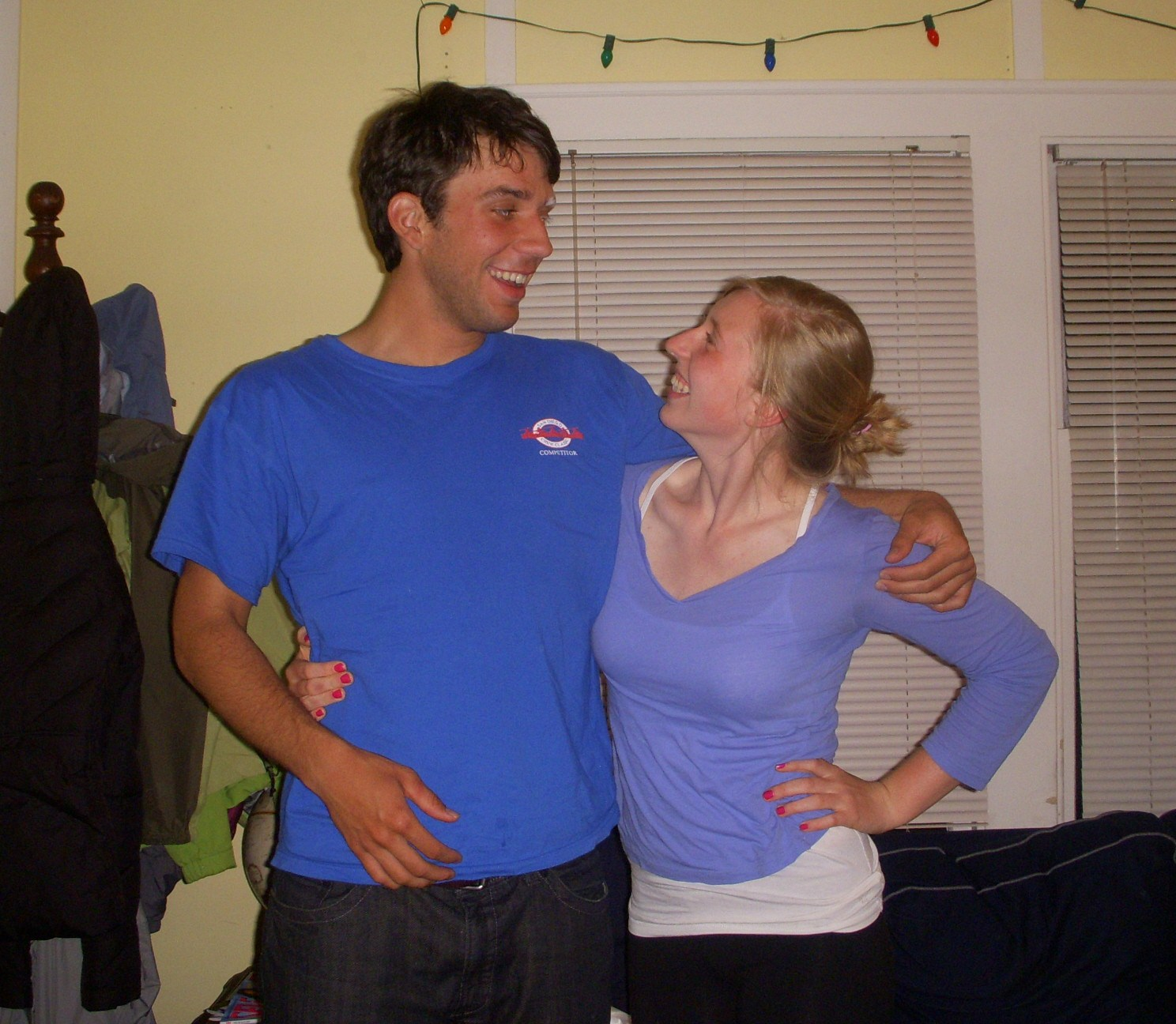
A man and woman demonstrate a side hug

A side hug is a display of affection in which a person hugs another by putting one arm around their shoulders or waist, rather than both arms around them. This can be useful for example when posing for a photograph, or if a full hug is considered too intimate for the situation.

== Religious attitudes to physical intimacy ==
=== Abstinence-only movement ===
Public displays of physical intimacy between intimate partners in romantic relationships are discouraged by many religious organisations that seek to discourage sexual intimacy. Brio magazine (published by Focus on the Family) advised readers to refrain from front hugging members of the opposite sex in 2007.

=== 2009 rap song ===
A rap song was performed by Ryan Pann as a skit at the 2009 Encounter Generation (EG) evangelical youth conference, hosted by The Fathers House church in Vacaville, California. A video of this became a YouTube meme in 2009 and was remarked on by such blogs as Feministe and Feministing and from there the mainstream press. The song's lyrics include such phrases as "This ain't no front hug zone" and "Jesus never hugged nobody like that".

Pann has said the song was satirizing the Christian habit of side hugging.

=== Avoiding accusations of child sexual assault ===
Many volunteer organizations including faith-based organizations like churches mandate that adult staff members and volunteers not fully hug children in their care. They encourage the use of side hugs as a rule for adults and staff members, especially when dealing with people of the opposite sex or children. This allows for intentions to be evident. In situations with children and youth this distinction is very important. If an adult employee or volunteer of a church does not use a side hug they may be accused, rightly or wrongly, of inappropriate advances. These rules are intended to protect both the potential victims and the potentially wrongly accused.
