= Caress (disambiguation) =

A caress is an expression of physical intimacy and care.

Caress may also refer to:

- Ronald Caress (1920–?), English professional rugby league footballer
- Zeke Caress (1884–1968), American bookmaker
- Caress, West Virginia, an unincorporated community, US
- "The Caress" (1995), a short story by Greg Egan from Axiomatic (Egan book)
- Caress Morell a fictional character from the TV series Dynasty
- Caress, an American Thoroughbred mare, namesake of the Caress Stakes, an American Thoroughbred horse racee
- The brand of Lux (soap) as sold in America

== See also ==
- Caress of the Sphinx (1896), a painting by Belgian Symbolist artist Fernand Khnopff, inspiration of "The Caress" in Axiomatic
- Cares (disambiguation)
