= Cuddle party =

Event where people cuddle in a group

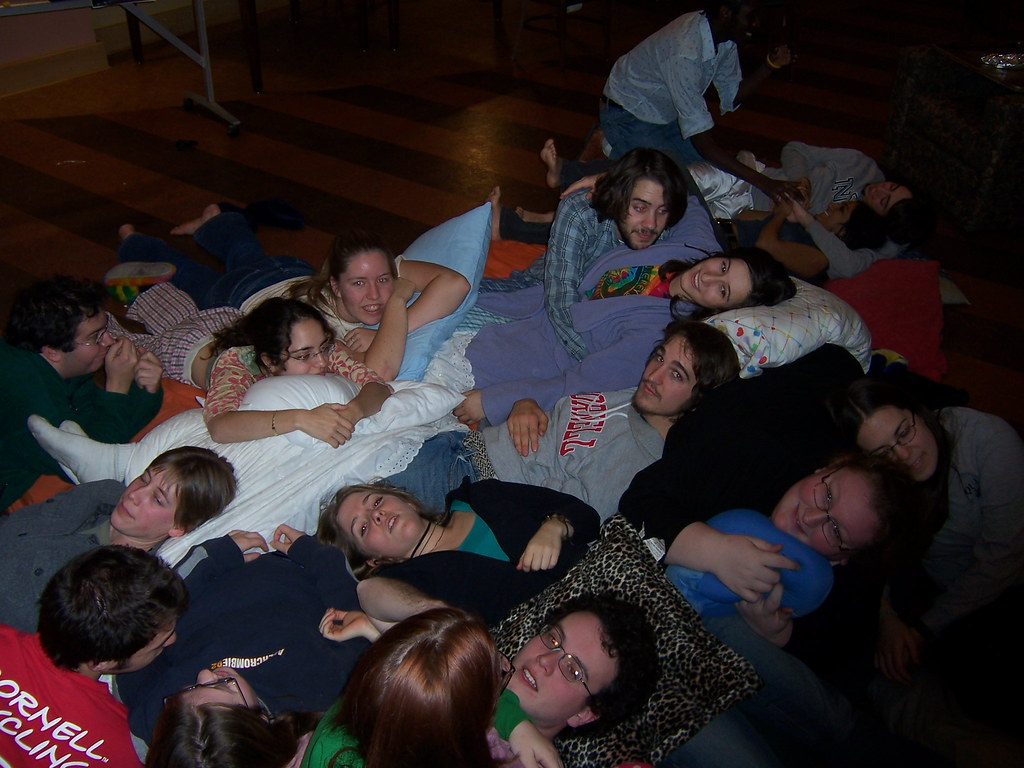
Students cuddling in 2005

A cuddle party (also called a cuddle puddle or snuggle party) is a small, structured social event intended to let people experience nonsexual group physical intimacy through cuddling. News coverage typically presents cuddle parties as a response to urban isolation and "touch deprivation."

== History ==
Cuddle parties originated in 2004 as a series of events in New York City run by relationship coaches Reid Mihalko and Marcia Baczynski, who described it as a safer space for people who felt intimidated by massage or tantra workshops. Cuddle parties later emerged in other cities, and facilitator training was provided by the originators.

== See also ==
- Somatosensory system
