= Haptic communication =

Communication via touch

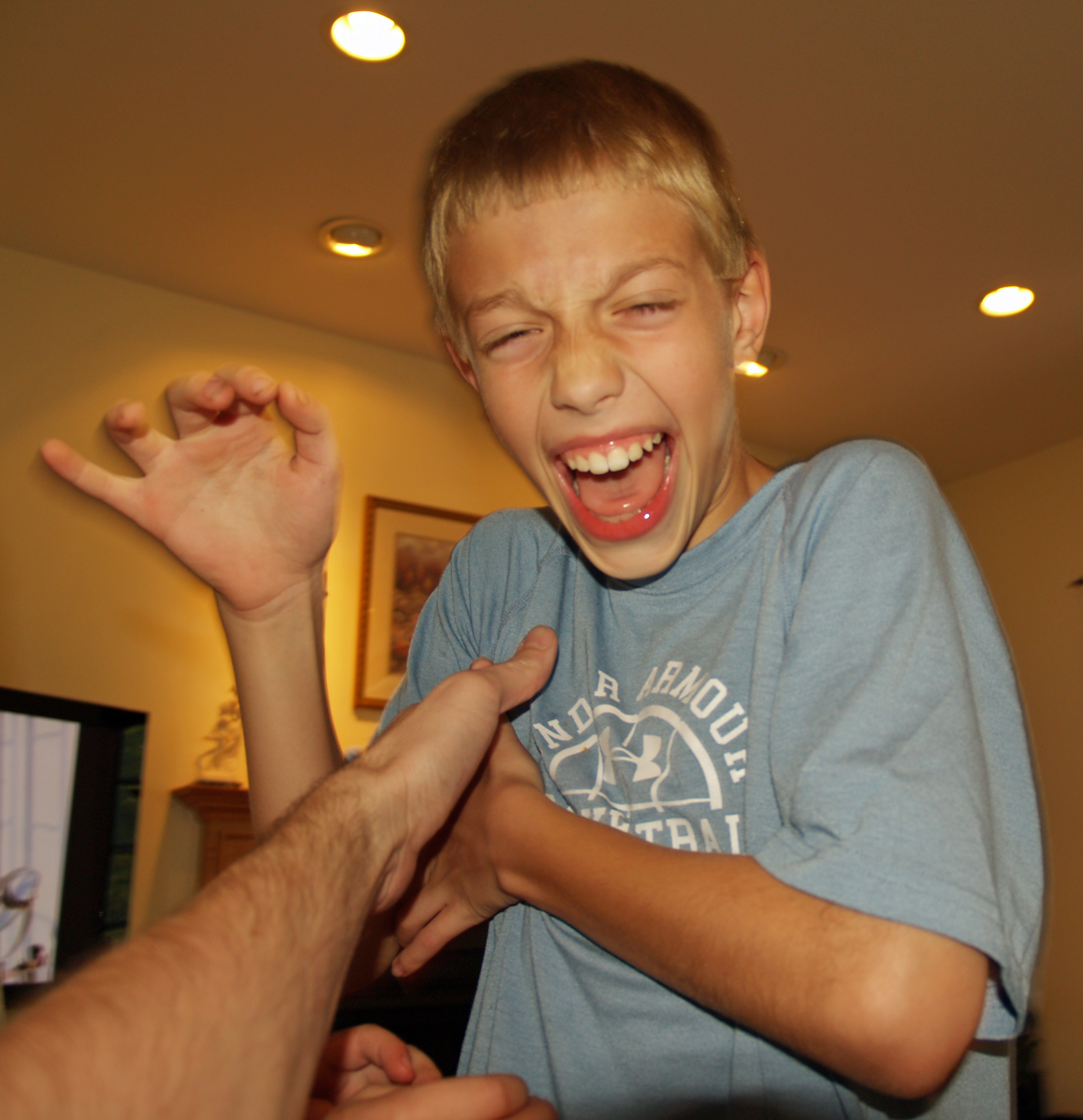
A boy laughing as he is tickled

Haptic communication is nonverbal communication and interaction via the sense of touch. Touch can come in many different forms, some can promote physical and psychological well-being. A warm, loving touch can lead to positive outcomes while a violent touch can ultimately lead to a negative outcome. The sense of touch allows one to experience different sensations such as pleasure, pain, heat, or cold. One of the most significant aspects of touch is the ability to convey and enhance physical intimacy. The sense of touch is the fundamental component of haptic communication for interpersonal relationships. Touch can be categorized in many terms such as positive, playful, control, ritualistic, task-related or unintentional. It can be both sexual (kissing is one example that some perceive as sexual), and platonic (such as hugging or a handshake). Striking, pushing, pulling, pinching, kicking, strangling and hand-to-hand fighting are forms of touch in the context of physical abuse.

Touch is the most sophisticated and intimate of the five senses. Touch or haptics, from the ancient Greek word haptikos, is vital for survival. Touch is the first sense to develop in the fetus. The development of an infant's haptic senses and how it relates to the development of the other senses, such as vision, has been the target of much research. Human babies have been observed to have enormous difficulty surviving if they do not possess a sense of touch, even if they retain sight and hearing. Infants who can perceive through touch, even without sight and hearing, tend to fare much better.

Similarly to infants, in chimpanzees the sense of touch is highly developed. As newborns they see and hear poorly but cling strongly to their mothers. Harry Harlow conducted a controversial study involving rhesus monkeys and observed that monkeys reared with a "terry cloth mother", a wire feeding apparatus wrapped in softer terry cloth which provided a level of tactile stimulation and comfort, were considerably more emotionally stable as adults than those with a mere "wire mother". For his experiment, he presented the infants with a clothed surrogate mother and a wire surrogate mother which held a bottle with food. It turns out that the rhesus monkeys spent most of their time with the terry cloth mother, over the wire surrogate with a bottle of food, which indicates that they preferred touch, warmth, and comfort over sustenance.

== Categories ==
Heslin outlines five haptic categories:

Functional/professional
expresses task-orientation
Social/polite
expresses ritual interaction
Friendship/warmth
expresses idiosyncratic relationship
Love/intimacy
expresses emotional attachment
Sexual/arousal
expresses sexual intent

The intent of a touch is not always exclusive and touching can evolve to each one of Heslin's categories.

=== Functional/professional ===
Managers should know the effectiveness of using touch while communicating to subordinates, but need to be cautious and understand how touch can be misunderstood. A hand on the shoulder for one person may mean a supportive gesture, while it could mean a sexual advance to another person. Working with others and using touch to communicate, a manager needs to be aware of each person's touch tolerance.

Henley's research found that a person in power is more likely to touch a subordinate, but the subordinate is not free to touch in kind. Touch is a powerful nonverbal communication tool and this different standard between a superior and subordinate can lead to confusion whether the touch is motivated by dominance or intimacy according to Borisoff and Victor.

Walton stated in his book that touching is the ultimate expression of closeness or confidence between two people, but not seen often in business or formal relationships. Touching stresses how special the message is that is being sent by the initiator. "If a word of praise is accompanied by a touch on the shoulder, that's the gold star on the ribbon," wrote Walton.

The most common use of haptic touch in business is the handshake. A handshake in the business world is key to giving a good first impression. However, there are different forms of the handshake that can be given in an appropriate situation which include: a firm handshake (communicates confidence and strength), a limp handshake (conveys weakness and dishonesty), a clasp (use of both hands displays a high level of respect), and a handshake with grip (displays intimidation and dominance).

=== Social/polite ===
Moving from one haptic category to another can become blurred by culture. There are many areas in the United States where a touch on the forearm is accepted as socially correct and polite. However, in the Midwest, this is not always an acceptable behavior.

The initial connection to another person in a professional setting usually starts off with a touch, specifically a handshake. A person's handshake can speak volumes about them and their personality. Chiarella wrote an article for Esquire magazine explaining to the predominantly male readership how handshakes differ from person to person and how they send nonverbal messages. He mentioned that holding the grip longer than two seconds will result in a stop in the verbal conversation, thus the nonverbal will override the verbal communication.

A handshake is not only limited to a professional setting but as well an important aspect of youth's team sports. Hamilton wrote that the handshake represents the end-of-game as an embodied ritual, form of intimate touch, and legal gesture. These handshakes also vary in types, with the formal business handshake that usually occurs in job and formal settings. In the end-of-game embodied ritual, this usually has high-fives in a post-game line. There is also the traditional dap up in certain social settings: a different type of handshake that can also serve as a greeting, departure, or overall a symbol of friendship. The word "dap" serves as an acronym for dignity and pride and signifies that the two people shake hands are equals in regards to one another. This handshake originated within the Vietnam War between black G.I.s as a way to combat the segregation faced within the war.

Jones explained communication with touch as the most intimate and involving form which helps people to keep good relationships with others. His study with Yarbrough covered touch sequences and individual touches.

Touch sequences fall into two different types, repetitive and strategic. Repetitive is when one person touches and the other person reciprocates. The majority of these touches are considered positive. Strategic touching is a series of touching usually with an ulterior or hidden motive thus making them seem to be using touch as a game to get someone to do something for them.

More common than the sequential touches are the individual or single touches. They must be read by using the total context of what was said, the nature of the relationship and what kind of social setting was involved when the person was touched.

Yarbrough designed a blueprint for how to touch. She designated the different body areas as to whether they are 'touchable' or not. Non-vulnerable body parts (NVBP) are the hand, arm, shoulder and upper back, and vulnerable body parts (VBP) are all other body regions.

Civil inattention is defined as the polite way to manage interaction with strangers by not engaging in any interpersonal communication or needing to respond to a stranger's touch. Goffman uses an elevator study to explain this phenomenon. It is uncommon for people to look at, talk to, or touch the person next to them. While it may be so crowded that they 'touch' another person, they will often maintain an expressionless demeanor so not to affect those around them.

=== Friendship/warmth ===
It is more acceptable for women to touch than men in social or friendship settings, possibly because of the inherent dominance of the person touching over the person being touched. Women and girls are more commonly known for interacting with each other through touch than men and boys are. This is thought to be because same-sex touch is acceptable for women. Whitcher and Fisher conducted a study to see whether friendly touch in a healthcare setting reduced anxiety equally or differently between men and women. A nurse was told to touch patients for one minute while the patients looked at a pamphlet during a routine preoperative procedure. Females reacted positively to the touch, whereas males did not. It was surmised that males equated the touch to being treated as inferior or dependent.

Touching among family members has been found to affect the behavior of those involved. Touch is a way that a child can express positive emotion. For example, physical affection, like hugs, can serve as an overt display of love. Various factors are at work within a family setting. As a child grows older, the amount of touching by the parent decreases although it does continue to be an important social behavior for that child to communicate positive or negative emotions later in their future.

=== Love and intimacy ===
==== Healthy touch ====
The primary nonverbal behavior that has the biggest effect on interpersonal relationships is touch. The amount of touching increases as a relationship moves from impersonal to personal.

Three areas of public touch between couples have been studied: the amount of touch between a couple in the initial stages of a romantic relationship; how much touching goes on between the couple, and the extent of touching with the amount of touch men and women displayed and who initiated the touch and when they initiated it.

Public touch can serve as a tie sign that shows others that one's partner is "taken". When a couple is holding hands or putting their arms around each other, this is a tie sign showing others that they are together. Tie signs are used more often by couples in the dating and courtship stages than between their married counterparts according to Burgoon, Buller, and Woodall.

Studies have also shown a difference between the sexes on who touches when. In the initial stages of a relationship, men often follow socially prescribed gender roles. Patterson indicated that men fulfilling this social role would touch more and after initial touch in casual relationships and as the relationship became more intimate during serious dating or marriage relationships, women would touch more. American culture still dictates that men "make the first move" in the context of dating and relationships.

Touching between married couples may help maintain good health. In a study by University of Virginia psychologist Jim Coan, women under stress showed signs of immediate relief by merely holding their husband's hand. This seemed to be effective when the woman was part of a satisfying marriage.

==== Violence ====
Touching in intimate relationships may also be violent at times. McEwan and Johnson categorize violent touch in relationships into two categories: intimate terrorism and common couple violence. Intimate terrorism is characterized by an escalating need to control or dominate a relationship with high frequency and severity. Common couple violence, on the other hand, is often a result of minor conflict, is less frequent and severe, and does not escalate over time. These definitions encompass the types of violence within a situation regarding a couple, both intimate terrorism and common couple violence. On a broader spectrum there is also domestic violence that regards all types of violence including emotional, physical, or sexual. But, instead of only in a couple situation, domestic violence is not limited to just that, it also defines situations with any family member or people who live together. This includes roommates as well and also includes different types of abuse such as child, elder, or marital abuse.

=== Sexual/arousal ===
According to Givens, the process of nonverbal communication or negotiation is to send and receive messages in an attempt to gain someone's approval or love. Courtship, which may lead to love, is defined as a nonverbal message designed to attract sexual partners. During courtship, we exchange nonverbal communication gestures to tell each other to come nearer and nearer until we touch. Essential signals in the path to intimacy include facial nuzzles, kissing and caressing each other.

Courtship has five phases which include the attention phase, recognition phase, conversation phase, touching phase, and the love-making phase. Haptics takes place more during the last two phases.

The touching phase:
First touch: Is likely to be more "accidental" than premeditated by touching a neutral body part and where the recipient either accepts the touch or rejects it through body movement.

Hugging: The embrace is the most basic way of telling someone that you love them and possibly need them, too.

Intention to touch: A nonverbal communication haptic code or cue is the intention behind it. Reaching your hand across the table to a somewhat unknown person is used as a way to show readiness to touch.

Kissing: Moving in concert by turning heads to allow for the lips to touch is the final part of the fourth stage of courtship, the kiss.

The final phase, love-making, which includes tactile stimulation during foreplay known as the light or protopathic touch. Any feelings of fear or apprehension may be calmed through other touching like kissing, nuzzling, and a gentle massage.

== Context of touch ==
There are various contexts and dimensions that touch can interpret. These dimensions that many have described include intensity, duration, location, frequency, and instrument of touch.

- Intensity: relates to how delicate or how strong the touch is.
- Duration: relates to how short or prolonged the touch was.
- Location: refers to the area where the person was touched.
- Frequency: represents the number of touches that happen.
- Instrument of touch: refers to the touch with other body parts like feet, lips, and other objects as well.

== Meanings ==
Touch research conducted by Jones and Yarbrough revealed 18 different meanings of touch, grouped in seven types: Positive affect (emotion), playfulness, control, ritual, hybrid (mixed), task-related, and accidental touch.

=== Positive affect ===
These touches communicate positive emotions and occur mostly between persons who have close relationships. These touches can be further classified as support, appreciation, inclusion, sexual interest or intent, and affection. Research has shown that hugging can reduce levels of the stress hormone cortisol.

- Support: Serve to nurture, reassure, or promise protection. These touches generally occur in situations which either virtually require or make it clearly preferable that one person show concern for another who is experiencing distress.
- Appreciation: Express gratitude for something another person has done.
- Inclusion: Draw attention to the act of being together and suggest psychological closeness.
- Sexual: Express physical attraction or sexual interest.
- Affection: Express generalized positive regard beyond mere acknowledgment of the other.

=== Playful ===
These touches serve to lighten an interaction. These touches communicate a double message since they always involve a play signal, either verbal or nonverbal, which indicates the behavior is not to be taken seriously. These touches can be further classified as affectionate and aggressive.

- Playful affection: Serve to lighten interaction. The seriousness of the positive message is diminished by the play signal. These touches indicate teasing and are usually mutual.
- Playful aggression: Like playful affection these touches are used to serve to lighten interaction, however, the play signal indicates aggression. These touches are initiated, rather than mutual. Since the playful aggression usually involves these antagonistic actions that from an outside perspective may be seen as serious, sometimes these playful actions can be categorized as violent. In a formal environment, this type of haptic communication may be frowned upon such as in schools or a work setting and could be prohibited.

=== Control ===
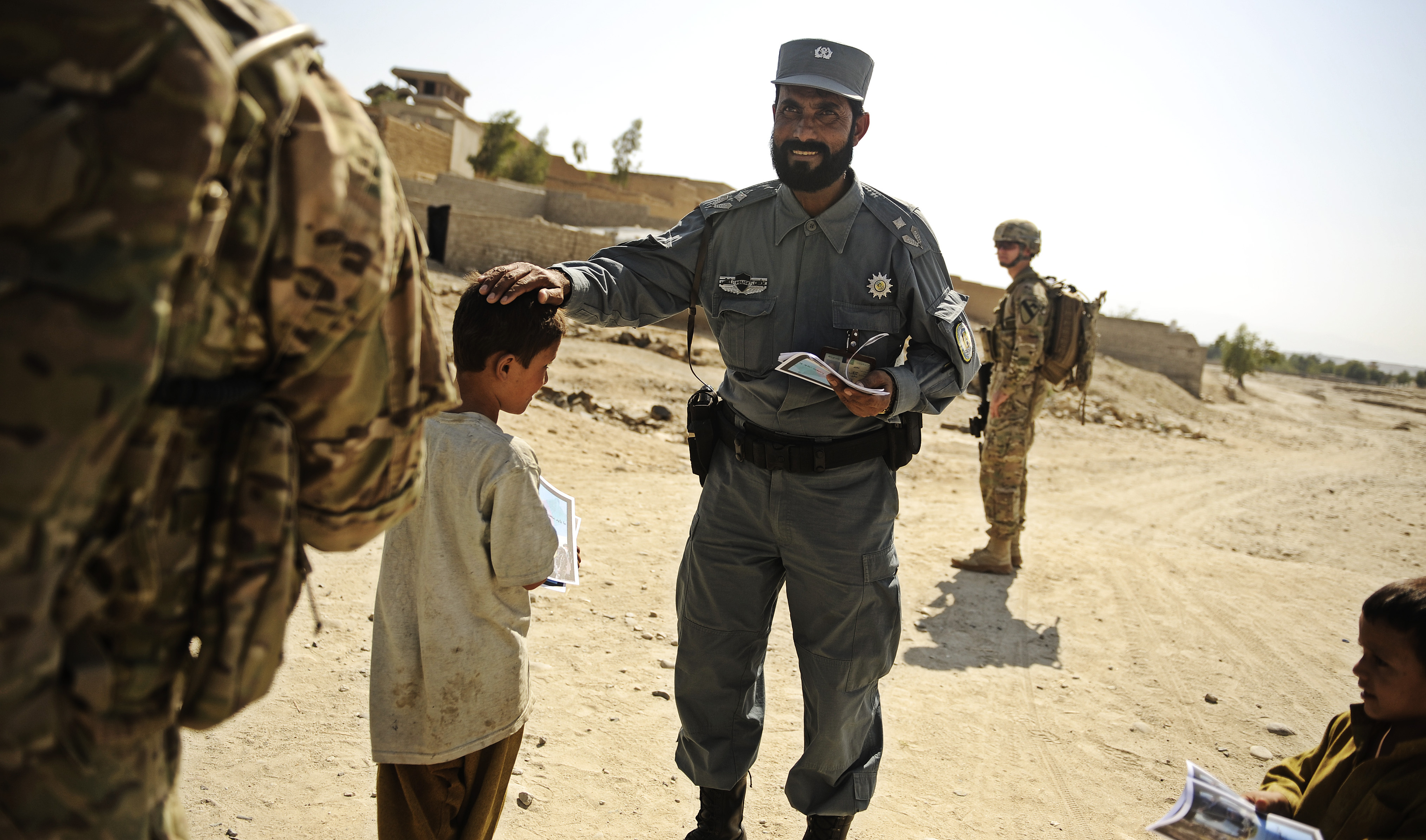
An Afghan police officer pats a child on the head.

These touches serve to direct the behavior, attitude, or feeling state of the recipient. The key feature of these touches is that almost all of the touches are initiated by the person who attempts influence. These touches can be further classified as compliance, attention-getting, and announcing a response.

- Compliance: Attempts to direct behavior of another person, and often, by implication, to influence attitudes or feelings.
- Attention-getting: Serve to direct the touch recipient's perceptual focus toward something.
- Announcing a response: Call attention to and emphasize a feeling state of initiator; implicitly requests affect response from another.

=== Ritualistic ===
These touches consist of greeting and departure touches. They serve no other function than to help make transitions in and out of focused interaction.

- Greeting: Serve as part of the act of acknowledging another at the opening of an encounter.
- Departure: Serve as a part of the act of closing an encounter

These touches can differ depending on the location the social interaction is taking place. For example, in Japan a common greeting and departure is to bow to someone when greeting them. For the Maori people, a tribe in New Zealand, people often rub noses to initiate a greeting, where two people press their forehead together and rub their noses with each other. These greetings are seen as a social norm due to their geographic location, depending on the location these types of greeting and departure touches will not be seen as socially acceptable. There is also differences within geographic locations as well, it then comes down to the formality of a setting. In America, it is common for people to greet friends with a hug, but in the setting of a job or an interview, one would normally have the greeting of a handshake instead. Social norms dictate much of the ritualistic behavior that is initiated.

=== Hybrid ===
These touches involve two or more of the meanings described above. These touches can be further classified as greeting/affection and departure/affection.

Greeting/affection: Express affection and acknowledgement of the initiation of an encounter

Departure/affection: Express affection and serve to close an encounter

=== Task-related ===
These touches are directly associated with the performance of a task. These touches can be further classified as:

- Reference to appearance: Point out or inspect a body part or artefact referred to in a verbal comment about appearance
- Instrumental ancillary: Occur as an unnecessary part of the accomplishment of a task
- Instrumental intrinsic: Accomplish a task in and out of itself i.e., a helping touch.

=== Accidental ===
These touches are perceived as unintentional and have no meaning. They consist mainly of brushes. Research by Martin in a retailing context found that male and female shoppers who were accidentally touched from behind by other shoppers left a store earlier than people who had not been touched and evaluated brands more negatively, resulting in the Accidental Interpersonal Touch effect.

== Culture ==
The amount of touching that occurs within a culture is largely based on the relative high context or low context of the culture.

=== High contact ===
In a high contact culture, many things are not verbally stated but are expressed through physical touch. For instance, Cheek kissing is a very common method of greeting in Latin America, but among Northern Europeans it is an uncommon form of greeting. Different cultures have different display rules, the degree with which emotions are expressed. Cultural display rules also affect the degree to which individuals share their personal space, gaze and physical contact during interactions. In a High contact culture, such as South America, Latin America, Southern Europe, Africa, Russia, the Middle East and others, people tend to share more physical contact. High contact cultures communicate through long gazes, long hugs, and share a decrease in proxemics.

=== Low contact ===
Low contact cultures such as: The United States, Canada, Northern Europe, Australia, New Zealand and Asia prefer infrequent touching, larger physical distance, indirect body orientations (during interaction) along with little share gazes. In the Thai culture, kissing a friend on the cheek is less common than in the Latin Americas. Remland and Jones studied groups of people communicating and found that in England (8%), France (5%) and the Netherlands (4%), touching was rare compared to the Italian (14%) and Greek (12.5%) samples.

=== Internal differences ===
Frequency of touch also varies significantly between different cultures. Harper refers to several studies, one of which examined touching in coffee houses. During a one-hour sitting 180 touchings were observed for Puerto Ricans, 110 for French, none for English and 2 for Americans. (Harper, 297). In order to know if someone was touching more frequently than normal it would be necessary to first know what is normal in that culture. In high touch countries a kiss on the cheek is considered a polite greeting while in Sweden it may be considered presumptuous. Jandt relates that two men holding hands will in some countries be a sign of friendly affection, whereas in the United States the same tactile code would probably be interpreted as a symbol of homosexual love.

== Emotion and touch ==
Recently, researchers have shown that touch communicates distinct emotions such as anger, fear, happiness, sympathy, love, and gratitude. Moreover, the accuracy with which subjects were capable of communicating the emotions were commensurate with facial and vocal displays of emotion.

Depression has been linked to touch deprivation in adults and research has established associations between touch deprivation and eating disorders. Men have been found more likely to experience touch deprivation than women due to stronger social prohibitions against same-sex touching among adult males.

=== Skin hunger ===
Skin hunger, also known as touch starvation or touch deprivation, is a physiological need in living beings to touch and be touched by other living beings. Discussion around skin hunger became more pronounced following the COVID-19 lockdowns due to the social and physical isolation that resulted from them.

== Tactile signing ==
Tactile signing is a common means of communication used by Deafblind people. It is based on a sign language or another system of manual communication.

"Tactile signing" refers to the mode or medium, i.e. signing (using some form of signed language or code), using touch. It does not indicate whether the signer is using a tactile form of a natural language (e.g. American Sign Language), a modified form of such a visual sign language, a modified form of a manually coded language, or something else.

== See also ==
- Consoling touch
- Haptic perception
- Physical intimacy:
  - Holding hands
  - Tickling
  - Kissing
  - Making out
  - Massage
    - Erotic massage
  - Human sexual activity
- Other touch:
  - Frotteurism
  - Groping
- Personal boundaries
- Cultural studies
- Edward T. Hall
- Bertram Raven
- Negiah
