= Touch starvation =

Lack of physical touch in a person's life

Touch starvation, also known as touch deprivation or skin hunger, is the physiological need by humans and other species for physical contact with their own species or other living beings. Its prolonged absence can have traumatic impacts on an individual's emotional, physical, and/or mental well-being. Absence can lead to or be exacerbated by loneliness and/or existing depressive symptoms. Though non-human therapies are thought to provide some supplemental benefit, lack of physical human contact is stated to be severely harmful to one's confidence, emotional regulation, and self image, especially during the early childhood development window.

== Biological explanation ==
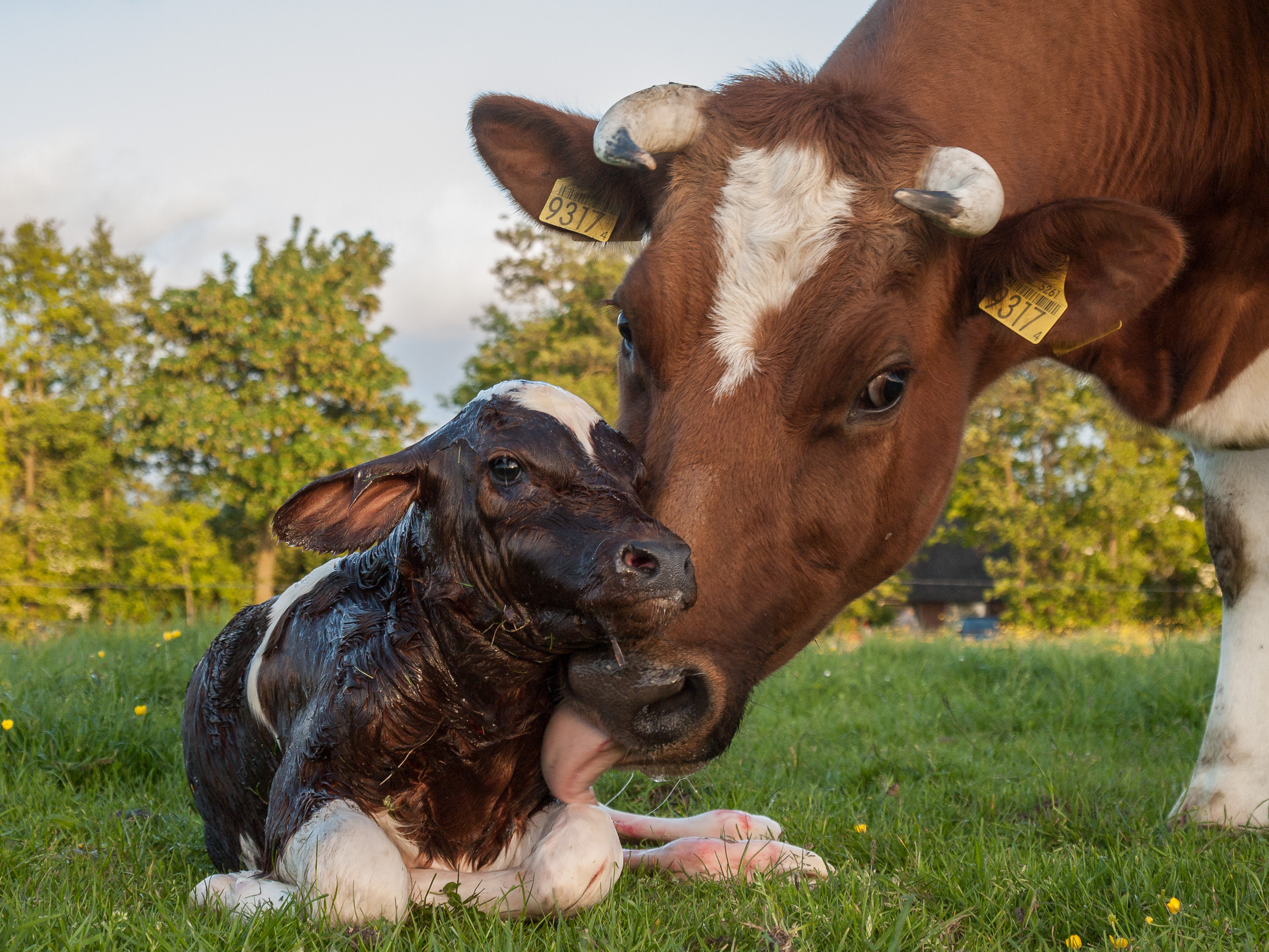
A red and white Holstein Friesian cow licking its calf

Touch is often referred to as the "mother of all the senses" due to it being the first sense to develop (as it develops in the womb) and is cited to be the most crucial for human development. At birth, humans receive all sensory input from their skin, and constantly require new feedback in order to support the proper biochemical development of the brain. Ashley Montagu was the first to argue against the predominant view that animals lick their young immediately after birth in order to groom them; he argued, instead, that close, consistent physical contact served to stimulate the infant's respiratory and digestive systems, and that without such stimulation they would die. Humans receive this stimulation in the womb and birth canal and thus do not require it.

The pleasurable experience of positive touch has, in recent decades, been attributed to a nerve fiber known as the C-tactile (CT) afferent; it is found in hairy skin and observes a preferential reaction to stimuli from other people.

Reciprocal touch and social interaction are critical to the biological function of most all complex life in much the same way as food or water. Helen Colton first made this point in 1983, stating that humans are born with "an intense 'skin hunger.'" Their work cited the 1966 scholarship of Sidney Jourard which "suggested that Americans are raised to think that touch must be either aggressive or sexual," and thus were hesitant to openly engage in positive physical contact with anyone other than sexual partners.

=== Social "craving" ===
Social interaction acts as a "primary reward" in social animals, and its restriction can cause altered or depressed behavior. A 2020 study published in Nature Neuroscience found a distinction between the striatal and cortical regions' responses to social vs. nutritional/appetitive craving (meaning the two do not originate from the same source). It further found that deprivation narrows the window of motivation, leading researchers to conclude that social isolation leads to social-craving (and thus, eventually, "social-starvation") in much the same way that abstaining from food/nutrition induces regular "hunger" and thus, eventually, "starvation".

Along the same line of reasoning, prolonged abstinence or restriction from physical contact can lead to similar consequences. Touch from another person (or, to a lesser extent, other living creatures) sends signals from the skin to the vagus nerve which triggers the release of oxytocin, serotonin, and dopamine in the brain. This in turn helps to reduce stress through the inhibition of and restriction on the production of cortisol, which regulates stress. A person's blood pressure is reduced and their heart rate and nervous system slow; symptoms of loneliness and depression improve. Physical contact is critical to the development of social bonds and relationships on some level in almost every culture worldwide; its absence for long periods of time, even when offset by social interaction in other spheres, can have serious consequences on a person's emotional regulation and stress-hormone balance, with psychological damage building over extended periods of restriction.

Individuals with greater sensitivity to touch, such as special needs or neurodivergent persons (especially children), those with trauma (particularly survivors of sexual abuse or physical abuse, as well as veterans with PTSD), or hypochondriacs, may be averse to physical contact and social interaction. They may wish to restrict either to certain degrees of interaction, persons, or parts of the body. Touch can thus sometimes have the opposite of its generally assumed effect because it is unwanted, triggering severe anxiety, stress, or fear, in some cases to such a degree that it produces a fight-or-flight response. Therapy for these individuals is nonetheless suggested by specialists to allow for some affective reciprocal physical contact, if nonetheless limited, as touch can still be beneficial if proper steps are taken to address the particular interests, restrictions, and needs of the person involved.

== Scholarship and cultural/circumstantial role ==
American scholarship from the late-20th century forward has promoted the need for increased physical touch among loved ones and in society at large. It also supports the notion that humans have historically understood the connection between physical touch and healing. A 1995 study published in the Journal of Psychosomatic Research suggested that touch and the development of a healthy relationship with touch plays a critical role in the development of proper self image, particularly one's body image. Its focus was the perceived sense of touch deprivation as felt between women with bulimia nervosa versus a control group, which found that the former were more likely to have a worse self-image and to consider themselves to have experienced tactile deprivation in childhood and be experiencing such deprivation at the time of the study.

=== Physical touch and age ===
==== Early childhood development ====
The overwhelming majority of scholarship states that physical touch/closeness, holding, and nurturing play a critical role in the development of secure attachment styles, early communication skills, and social behavior in infants. In general, infants will naturally seek physical connection with their caregiver. Such attention being withheld can have a pronounced negative impact on children's development, and can lead to the development of insecure attachment styles and volatile tendencies, as well as broader insecurities which prevent maturation, full motor skill development, and emotional involvement with others in adulthood.

In children with autism, self-soothing techniques such as brushing, swinging (of the arms and legs), and jumping were found to have a positive effect on emotional regulation and to reduce tactile sensitivity, without note for physical touch received in other settings; this may indicate a potential alternative for parents in the absence of comfortable or practical options for their child for physical contact with others.

==== Aging ====
Despite its critical role in their well-functioning, most people receive less physical touch as they age. As a person gets older, their tactile sensitivity decreases, leading to a lower sensory response from most physical input. However, the positive response generated by 'pleasant' touch in old age is even more pronounced. Though there is no proof of a social-emotional benefit, massage therapy has been shown to enhance relaxation and improve mood in elderly recipients.

=== Gender split ===
Though research initially claimed that women receive greater enjoyment than men from physical touch, later scholarship has challenged that notion due to the wide variability in the experience, reception, and initiation of contact among members of both sexes. Research published in Physiology & Behavior concluded through two separate studies that women were arguably more likely to use physical touch as a coping mechanism than men, though researchers noted that conclusions in the field thus far were imperfect.

== History and counter-arguments ==
=== Comfort-contact theory ===
In the 1960s, Harry Harlow studied baby rhesus monkeys who were separated from their mothers and given two surrogate mothers, one of terrycloth that gave them no food and another made of wire that did provide food. The baby monkeys spent more time with the terrycloth mothers because they simulated comforting touch.

=== Solitary confinement ===
Prisoners often report craving human touch and contact during their time in solitary confinement, which can serve as one of many contributing factors to the near-universally observed negative effects physical and social isolation have on them. People in confinement have reported physical symptoms consistent with hypertension, such as "chronic headaches, trembling, sweaty palms, extreme dizziness and heart palpitation," as well as trouble eating, irregular digestion, and oversensitivity to unexpected normal stimuli. Isolation, especially for long periods or if conducted/executed repeatedly, can lead the individual into psychosis or thoughts/acts of self harm or suicide. Other psychological effects include irritability, hostility, lack of impulse control, anxiogenic and emotional volatility, mood swings, hopelessness, and depression.

=== COVID-19 pandemic ===
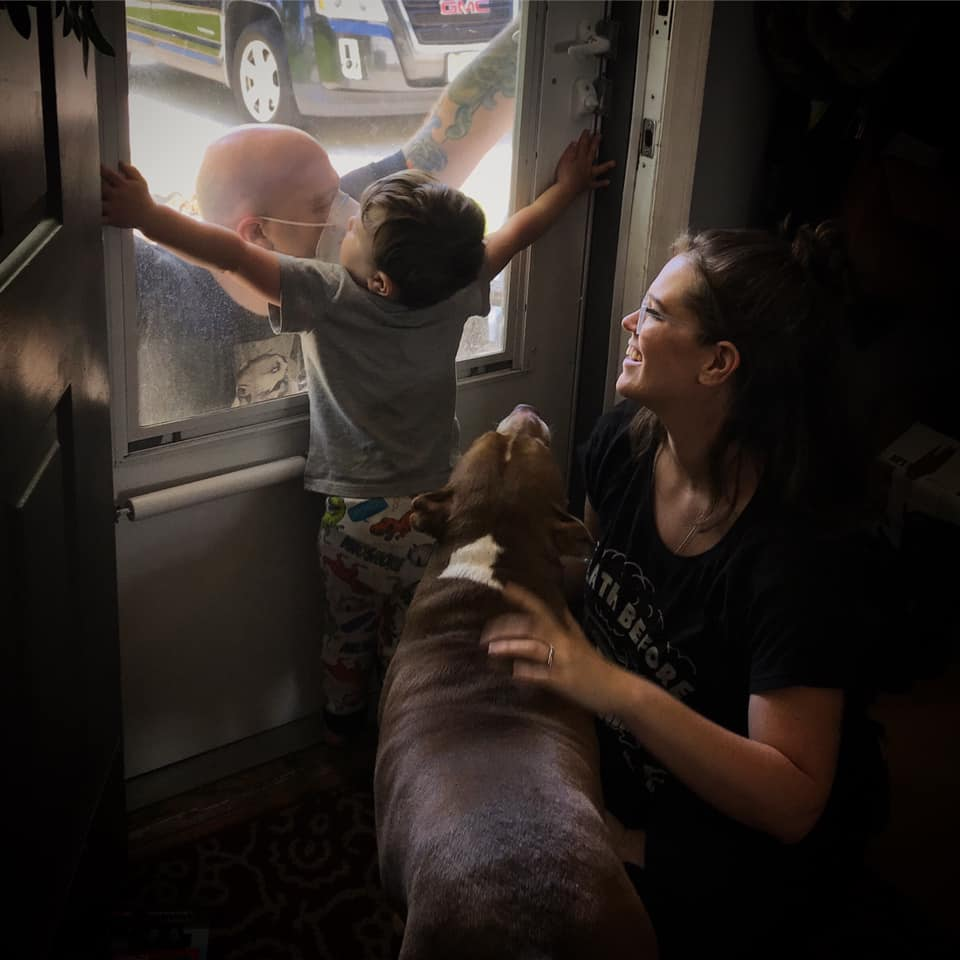
People simulating a hug through a glass pane door, during the COVID-19 pandemic

The COVID-19 pandemic greatly restricted the ability of much of the world's population to engage in regular physical contact with others, following scientific and factually backed consensus on the establishment of social distancing measures (SDM) to reduce the possibility of human-to-human transmission of SARS-CoV-2, such as governmental stay-at-home mandates and social distancing. In the active pandemic period, diminishing of subjective human perception on the pleasure surging from touching other humans was recorded, but the overall perception on pleasure from social connections that do not require touch heightened. Most sources suggest this had a pronounced effect on most people's mental and emotional well-being amid the lockdown period, but long term impacts are yet not known with certainty.

Initial studies have found that people who attended recommendations on implementing SDM during the pandemic (from less invasive such as limiting handshakes to more invasive such as stay-at-home mandates) experienced a significant decline in their perception of quality of physical, psychological and social life during the time where the measures were implemented in their communities. At the same time, other researchers have found that the lifting of SDM reduced the longing for touch documented during the peaks of the outbreak up to eight percentage points, but didn't find evidence for a continuing trend of decrement; post-pandemic environmental and psychological factors, such as aversion to touch or the subjective and measurable differences in the quality and number of individual and communal social relationships compared to pre-pandemic periods may play a factor. Another study, which was conducted using Japanese Twitter public posts data during the several waves of the outbreak on the country and post-pandemic posts, found that desire for touching other humans and non-human animals incremented during the public health emergency of international concern (PHEIC) and remained steady afterwards, representing a cultural-specific switch in the attitude towards touch in a society where physical contact is limited for closer and deeper relationships.

A worsening of mental health status in 14-21 year olds that weren't experiencing symptoms of depressive or anxiety disorders previous to the pandemic was registered on 2022, the authors of the study used an indirect measure method that does not collect data on the causes of the symptoms or the surge of life-changing events, but isolation and delayed social learning and exposure stages may increase the occurrence of unhealthy lifestyles, depression, anxiety and post-traumatic stress disorders which in turn cause feedback loops of isolation and restriction of physical contact. Some authors found that the prevalence of touch-restricting measures during stay-at-home mandates or quarantining caused more intense feelings of loneliness than anxiousness.

The pandemic highlighted the fundamental need of intraspecific touch and calls for the review of social and exact scientists, as well as decision-makers and general society to establish, evaluate and maintain future or current social safety nets and focus on providing care and attention to individuals who are particularly vulnerable to loneliness in times of crisis, such as romantically single people or those with difficult family relationships.

=== Life without a sense of touch – Kim Stenger ===
At present, Kim Stenger is the world's only living person without a sense of touch, living with a condition known as Complete sensory neuropathy. Though paralyzed from the waist down, she maintains all of her other senses and currently serves as a criminal law researcher for the Cuyahoga County Prosecutor in Cleveland, Ohio. She shows no signs of serious mental or emotional trauma as a result of her condition, which researchers from the University of Chicago believe is attributed to the full range of other senses she had access to observe and comprehend her parents' love and affection in her early childhood. The researchers claim this represents proof that a sense of touch is not a contingent factor of normal social-emotional development.

== See also ==
- Affective haptics
- Consoling touch
- Emotional isolation
- Haptic communication
- Haptic perception
- Loneliness
- Physical intimacy
- Pit of despair
- Social isolation
