= Glomp =

Aggressive or highly enthusiastic form of hugging

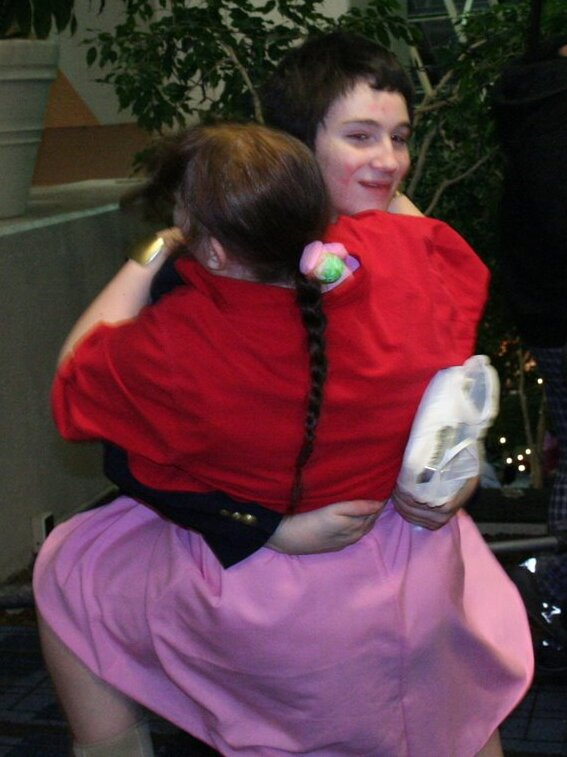
Two attendees at Ohayocon in 2008 glomping

A glomp or glomping, sometimes referred to as a tackle hug, is a form of aggressive hugging in which the initiating party dives or lunges at the receiving party in the manner of a tackle. Glomping is frequently associated with anime and manga, where it is depicted as a form of slapstick or physical comedy. Glomping is also practiced by members of the anime and manga fandom, particularly attendees of anime and manga conventions.

== Description and history ==
A glomp is an aggressive or highly enthusiastic form of hugging wherein the active partner dives or lunges at the receiving partner, as akin to a tackle or bear hug. It is often taken from a running start and with the receiving partner unaware of the active partner's approach. The active partner aims to wrap their arms and occasionally their legs completely around the receiving partner, which frequently results in both individuals being knocked to the ground.

In fictional media, glomping is typically rendered as a form of slapstick or physical comedy to indicate feelings of affection or attraction by one character towards another. Though tackling hugs appeared in media such as comics and animation prior to the emergence of "glomp" as a proper term in the early 1990s, glomping is primarily associated with manga and anime. The precise etymology of "glomp" is unclear, though the term has been associated with early English-language translations of manga by American publisher Viz Media, particularly Ranma ½ by Rumiko Takahashi. "Glomp" was used in these translations as an onomatopoeia for tackling hugs, possibly as a synthesis from the word "glom". Later, "grab, latch on, maintain pressure" emerged as a backronym for the term.

Glomping occurs as a real-life practice among members of the anime and manga fandom, particularly attendees of anime and manga conventions. Though glomping in this context is ostensibly performed as a friendly or affectionate gesture, the possibility of glomping resulting in injury, harassment, or damage to cosplay costumes has resulted in the discouragement of the practice unless consent is obtained from both parties, and the implementation by some conventions of policies that prohibit glomping. At some conventions, attendees participate in so-called "glomping circles" akin to a mass group hug; one such glomping circle at the anime convention Anime Expo in 2008 reportedly lasted for seven hours.

== See also ==
- Glossary of anime and manga
