= Ronald Caress =

English rugby league footballer

Personal information
- Born: third 1/4 1920
- Died: unknown

Playing information
- Position: Wing, Centre
Club
Years	Team	Pld	T	G	FG	P
1940–44	Wakefield Trinity	58	9	0	0	27
1944	→ Castleford (guest)	1	0	0	0	0
	Total	59	9	0	0	27

Ronald Caress (third 1/4 1920 – death unknown) was an English professional rugby league footballer who played in the 1940s. He played at club level for Wakefield Trinity and Castleford (World War II guest), as a wing or centre.

== Background ==
Ronald Caress' birth was registered in Wakefield, West Riding of Yorkshire, England.

== Playing career ==
=== Club career ===
Ronald Caress made his début for Wakefield Trinity during October 1940, he played his last match for Wakefield Trinity during November 1944, he transferred as a World War II guest from Wakefield Trinity to Castleford, he made his début for Castleford on Saturday 11 November 1944, and he played his last match for Castleford on Saturday 11 November 1944.
