= Hug =

Form of endearment

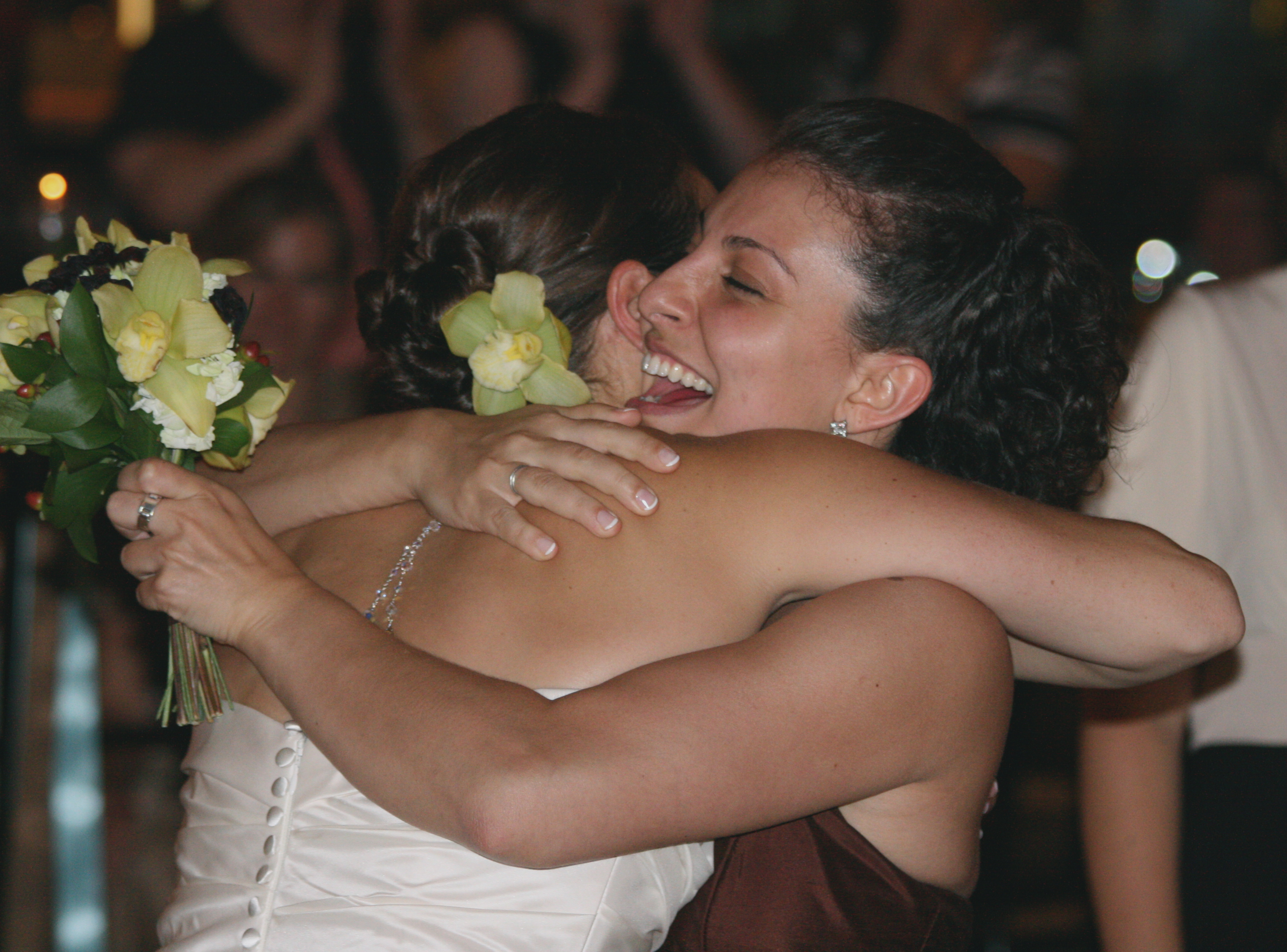
A joyful hug between two women at a wedding

A hug is a form of endearment, found in virtually all human communities, in which two or more people put their arms around the neck, back, under the armpits or waists of one another and hold each other closely. If more than two people are involved, it may be referred to as a group hug.

== Etymology ==
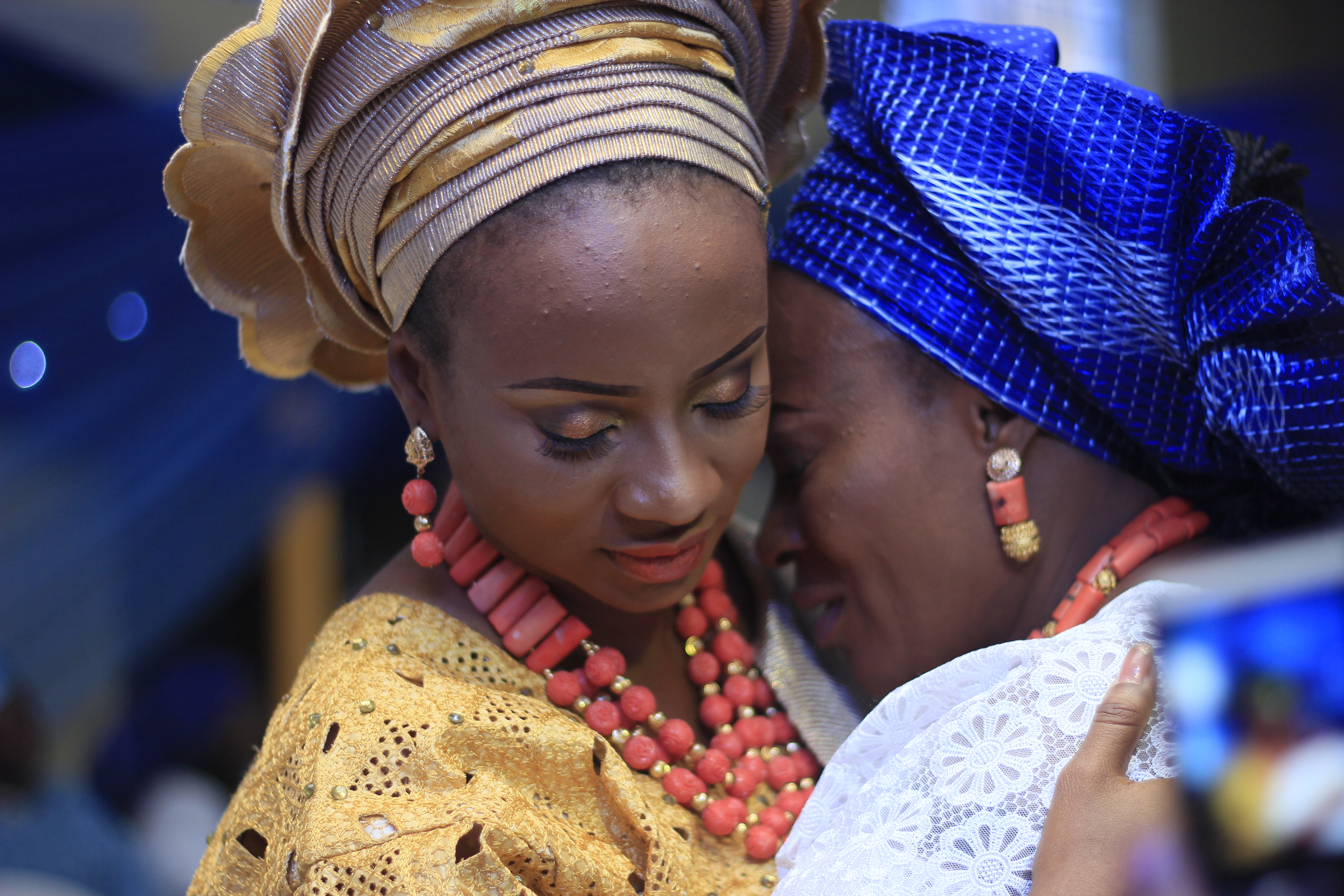
A Yoruba bride and mother

The origins of the word are not known, but two hypotheses exist. The first is that the verb hug, first used in the 1560s, could be related to the Old Norse word hugga, which meant to comfort. The second hypothesis is that the word is related to the German word hegen, which means to foster or cherish, and originally meant to enclose with a hedge.

== Characteristics ==
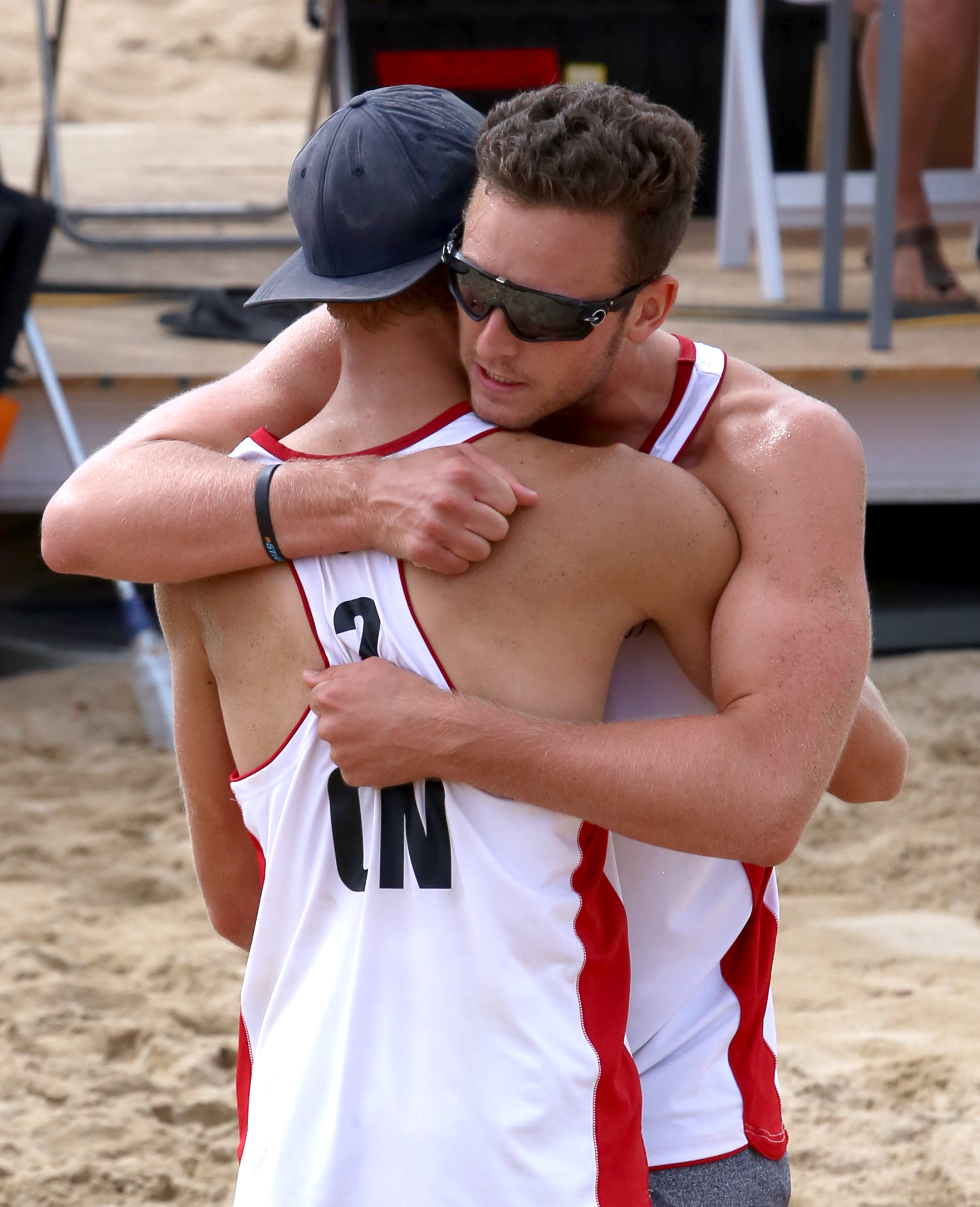
Two men hug after a volleyball match in Canada

A hug, sometimes in association with a kiss, is a form of nonverbal communication. Depending on culture, context and relationship, a hug can indicate familiarity, love, affection, friendship, gratitude, fraternity, flirting, or sympathy.

Hugs can indicate support, comfort, and consolation, particularly where words are insufficient. A hug usually demonstrates affection and emotional warmth, sometimes arising from joy or happiness when reunited with someone or seeing someone absent after a long time. A non-reciprocal hug may demonstrate a relational problem.

A hug can range from a brief one-second squeeze, with the arms not fully around the other person, to an extended holding. The length of a hug in any situation is socially and culturally determined. In the case of lovers, and occasionally others, the hips may also be pressed together. The emotionality of the hug can also influence the direction of the hug.

The direction of hugs generally corresponds with handedness, with right-handed people tending to lead with the right hand, but a heightened emotional state makes it slightly more likely for people to lead with the left hand. This small but significant effect has been attributed to right-hemispheric emotional processing.

== Cultural aspects ==
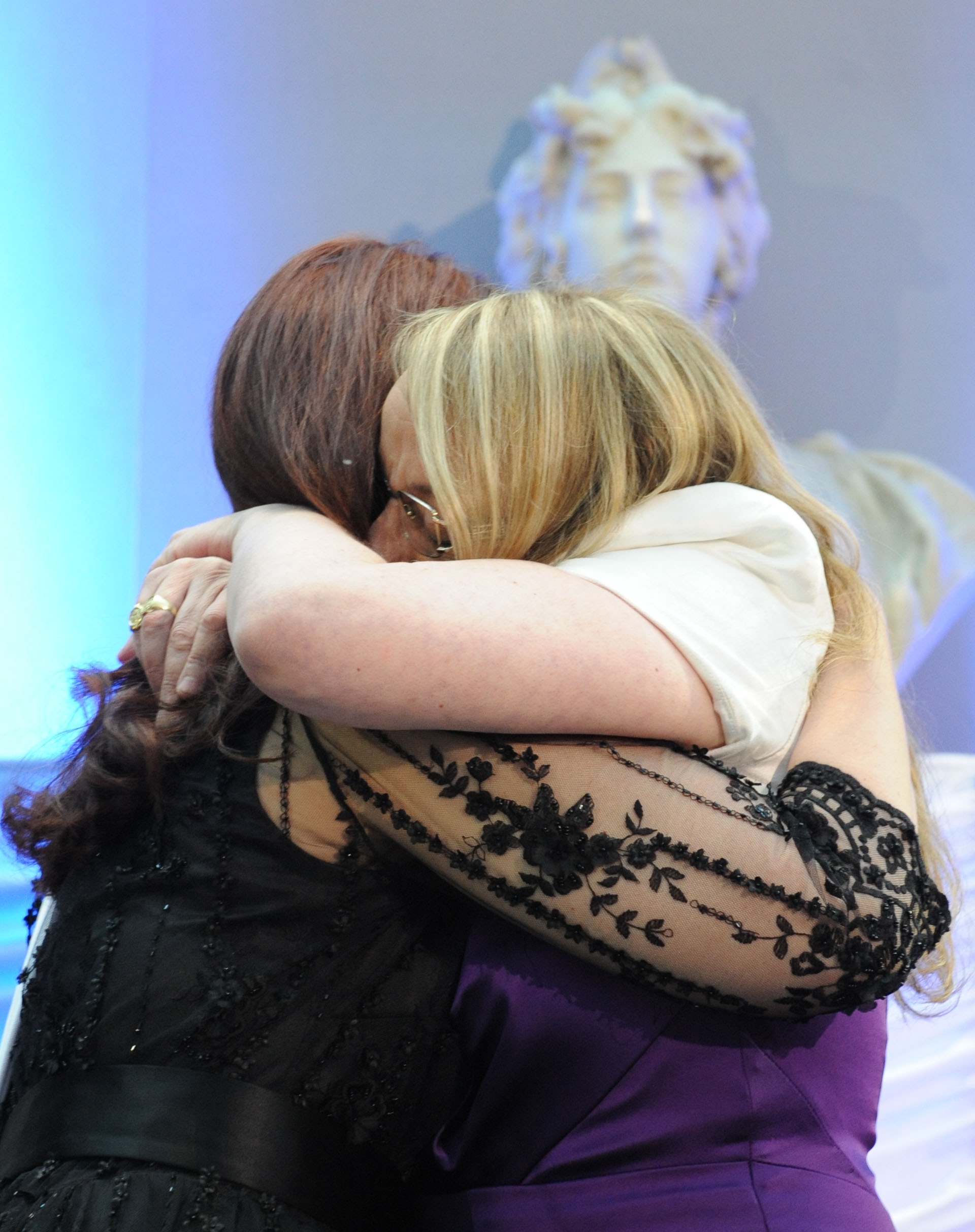
Two women hugging in Argentina

While less common, hugging may be undertaken as part of a ritual or social act in certain social groups. It is a custom in some cultures such as France, Spain and Latin America for male friends to hug (as well as slap each other on the back) in a joyous greeting. A similar hug, usually accompanied by a kiss on the cheek, is also becoming a custom among Western women at meeting or parting. In Portugal and Brazil, it is common, mostly among males, to finish letters and emails with Um abraço or Abraço ('a hug', or 'hug') followed by the sender's signature. Similar formulas may be used in oral communication. In the Roman Catholic rite of the Holy Mass, a hug may be substituted for a kiss or handshake amid the kiss of peace ritual.

In May 2009, The New York Times reported that "the hug has become the favorite social greeting when teenagers meet or part these days" in the United States. A number of schools in the United States have issued bans on hugs, which in some cases have resulted in student-led protests against these bans.

A Canadian journalistic investigation in 2015 noted the popularity of the hug in bromance among young francophone adults in Quebec, Canada.

Unlike some other types of physical contact, a hug can be practiced publicly and privately without stigma in many countries, especially within families and close friendships across different age lines, and it is generally an indication that people are familiar with each other. Moving from a handshake (or touch-free) relationship to a hug relationship is a sign of a closer friendship. However, while practiced in many parts of the world, the prevalence of hugging is generally more variable across some countries and different religions, cultures and gender lines.

An unexpected hug can be regarded as an invasion of a person's personal space, but if it is reciprocated, it is an indication that it is welcome. Some Western culture commentators advise avoiding hugs at work to prevent uncomfortable moments, especially with people who dislike hugging. A person, especially a child, may also caress or hug a doll or stuffed animal. Young children may hug their parents when they feel threatened by an unfamiliar person, although this might be regarded as clinging onto rather than hugging since it demonstrates a need for protection rather than affection. During the Islamic fasting month of Ramadan, it is halal (permissible) for someone to hug one's significant other during daylight hours if one has self-control. However, if accompanied by libidinous urges, it is haram (sinful).

There are some cultures where hugging is either uncommon or less prevalent. Hugging between the opposite gender outside the same family is uncommon and often considered haram in many traditional Islamic communities. It is also uncommon or less frequent in some East, Southeast and South Asian countries such as China Japan, Thailand and India, especially outside the same family and between opposite genders.

== Health benefits ==
Hugging has been proven to have health benefits. One study has shown that hugs increase levels of oxytocin and reduce blood pressure. Research indicates that a 20-second-or-longer hug releases oxytocin. Hugging can also buffer against the release of the stress hormone cortisol if a romantic partner hug is shared before a stressful situation. However, this effect was only observed for women and not for men.

== Group hug ==
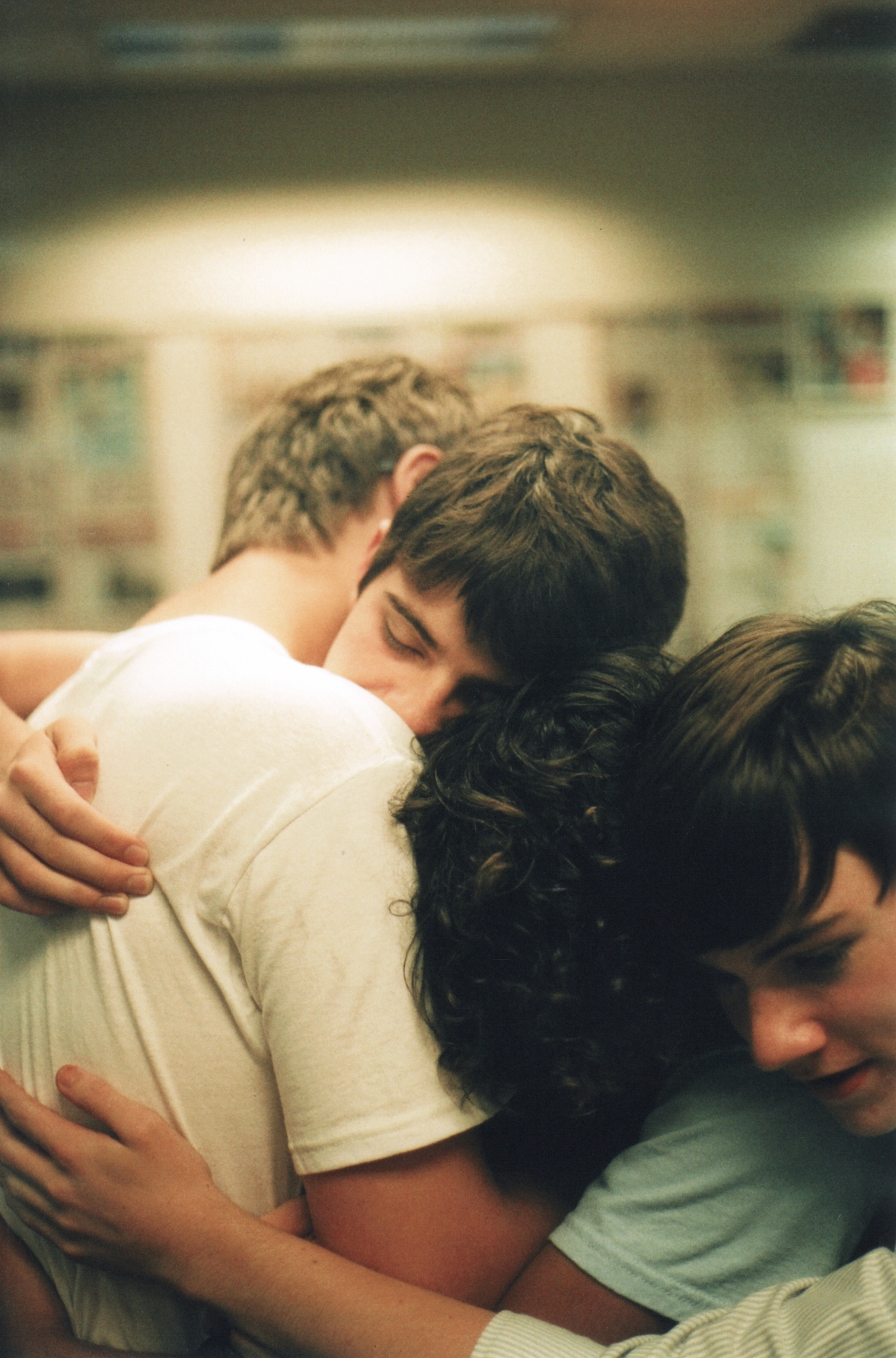
A group hug among young men

A group hug involves more than two people embracing each other by wrapping their arms around one another in order to physically express their bond with each other. A group hug has been found to be a useful tool in group therapy to cement a sense of cohesion among the participants after a session, although it may cause discomfort for group members who shy away from physical contact.

== Cuddling ==
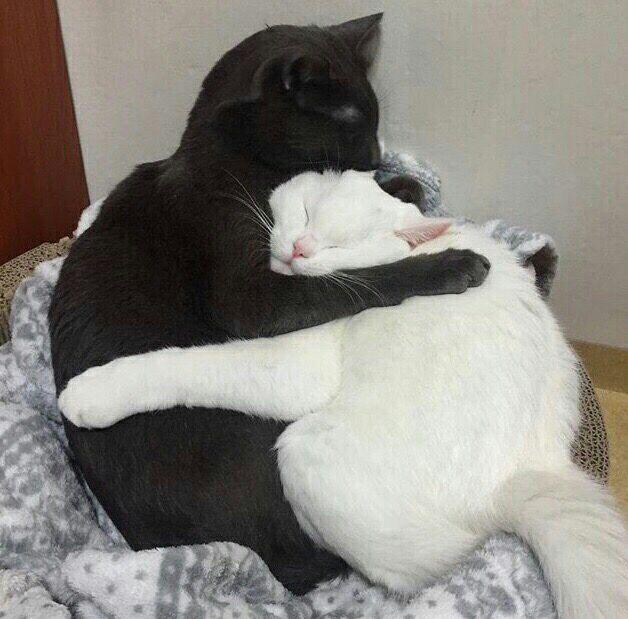
Two cats cuddling

Cuddling is a related form of physical contact in which two or more people hold one another in each other's arms for an extended period of time. Cuddling can be with family members, friends or lovers. Similar to hugging, cuddling is a more affectionate and intimate embrace, normally done for a longer period of time (usually lasting from a few minutes to several hours). In contrast to hugging, which can often be a nonverbal greeting or parting tradition, cuddling is usually shared between two people who are lying down together or sitting somewhere in an intimate manner. Like hugging, cuddling makes the body release oxytocin, which has a variety of effects. In some cities around the United States, cuddling has evolved into a social activity, where individuals gather for the purpose of cuddling.

== See also ==
- Bear hug
- Cuddle party
- Free Hugs Campaign
- Glomp
- Haptic communication
- Hug machine
- National Hugging Day
- Pound hug
- Side hug
