= Consolation =

Psychological comforting after a trauma

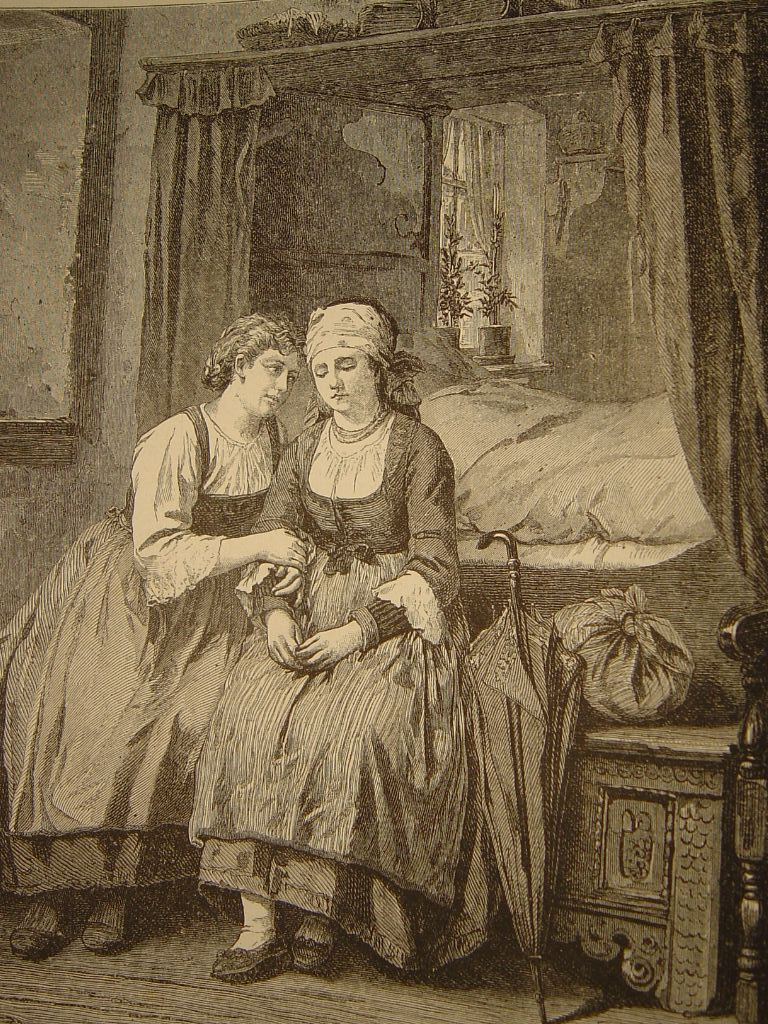
Consolation, by A. Kindler.

Consolation, consolement, and solace are terms referring to psychological comfort given to someone who has suffered severe, upsetting loss, such as the death of a loved one. It is typically provided by expressing shared regret for that loss and highlighting the hope for positive events in the future. Consolation is an important topic arising in history, the arts, philosophy, and psychology.

In the field of medicine, consolation has been broadly described as follows:

Before and after fundamental medicine offers diagnoses, drugs, and surgery to those who suffer, it should offer consolation. Consolation is a gift. Consolation comforts when loss occurs or is inevitable. This comfort may be one person's promise not to abandon another. Consolation may render loss more bearable by inviting some shift in belief about the point of living a life that includes suffering. Thus consolation implies a period of transition: a preparation for a time when the present suffering will have turned. Consolation promises that turning.

In some contexts, particularly in religious terminology, consolation is described as the opposite or counterpart to the experience of "desolation", or complete loss.

== History ==
The desire to console others is an expression of empathy, and appears to be instinctual in primates. Dutch primatologist Frans de Waal has observed acts of consolation occurring among non-human primates such as chimpanzees. The formal concept of consolation as a social practice has existed since ancient times. For example, as an examination of letters from ancient Rome indicates of that culture:

To console the bereaved was an important responsibility. The person offering consolation and the bereaved person were both expected to behave in certain ways and to say certain things, and the consoler to provide support of both an emotional and practical kind.

Although "the most frequent occasion for consolation was death", ancient consolation literature addressed other causes for consolation, including "exile, poverty, political failure, illness, shipwreck, and old age". Papyrus letters from that era "often employ standard consolations, such as 'death is common to all' and frequently mention the dispatch of food stuffs". It is noted that food may have been offered as a further consolation to the bereaved, or may have had a religious purpose. It is reported that in the Fifth Century BCE, the Sophist, Antiphon, set up a booth in a public agora where he offered consolation to the bereaved. Furthermore, "[v]isits of consolation in antiquity extended to popular levels as well", including visits by philosophers intended to hearten villages that were facing invasion.

In both ancient Greece and Rome, the Consolatio or consolatory oration was a type of ceremonial oration, typically used rhetorically to comfort mourners at funerals. It became one of the most popular classical rhetoric topics. The Platonist philosopher Crantor of Soli (c. 325–c. 275 BC), a member of Plato's Academy, pioneered the writing of essays in this distinct tradition. Although only fragments of his essays have survived, his influence is noted in the works of later writers, particularly Cicero's Tusculan Disputations and Plutarch's Consolation to Apollonius. Seneca the Younger (4 BC–65 AD) produced the most recognizable examples of Consolatio in his three Consolations, Ad Marciam, Ad Polybium, and Ad Helviam Matrem. The most recognizable example of Consolatio in verse form is the pseudo-Ovidian Consolatio ad Liviam. Plutarch's works include three works constructed in the Consolatio tradition: De exilio, Consolatio ad uxorem, Consolatio ad Apollonium.

Historically and philosophically, consolation plays an important symbolic role in the sixth century work, On the Consolation of Philosophy. The author, Boethius, describes himself as being consoled by "Lady Philosophy" (a personification of philosophy) after having been sentenced to death for alleged crimes against the state. Taken literally, Boethius consoles himself for the anguish of knowing that his death has been decreed by philosophizing.

== In the arts ==
Consolation is also a classical theme in the arts. The poetic form of elegy, for example, has been described as "a verbal presentation or staging of emotion, wherein the detached speaker engages the audience with the intent of achieving some form of cathartic consolation". Examples of literary devices which may be used to provide consolation include prosopopoeia, wherein an author or speaker may provide a representation of the ongoing thoughts or opinions of a deceased person.

== In religion ==
Religious figures are often depicted as offering consolation to their followers during times of grief. For example, in the Mahabharata, the Hindu avatar Krishna consoles his brother Balarama and the princess Sathya Bama after they have been humiliated for their prideful ways. More famously, in the Bhagavad Gita, when Arjuna learned that Krishna was dying of an injury, Krishna consoled him with touching philosophy. In Christianity, one of the iconic Stations of the Cross recalls that "Jesus console[d] the daughters of Jerusalem". A substantial body of Christian literature exists exhorting followers to take consolation in their faith for the various ills that befall them in life. One branch of Christianity, Catharism, practiced a sacrament called consolamentum, which required consolation for the inevitable regret of living in order to move nearer to God or to approach heaven.

There is a tradition within the Catholic church whereby believers, in their mystical union with Jesus Christ, seek to provide consolation to Jesus in recognition of his sufferings endured on their behalf. This tradition is referenced in the writings of Pope Pius XI and Pope Francis. Francis invokes and supports this tradition, asking "If we truly love the Lord, how could we not desire to console him?".

== In competition ==
In some kinds of competitions, losing competitors receive some form of award or recognition as a consolation for their loss. This may come in the form of a consolation prize given to a runner-up, or a consolation match in a sports tournament, wherein the top two teams compete for first and second place, while the next two teams compete for the prize of the third-place finish.

An example of this occurs in the Iliad, where Homer writes of an incident where Achilles is judging sporting contests being held among the Greeks during the funeral of Patroclus. During a chariot race, Eumelus, who is known to be a great chariot driver, has a crash that causes him to come in last. Achilles expresses a desire to give Eumeles the second-place prize, a consolation prize in recognition of the losing participant's merit as a charioteer. This effort to award a consolation prize is thwarted by the actual second-place participant, Antilochus who successfully objects that the prize should go to the competitor whose performance met the requirements of winning the prize.

== See also ==
- Comfort
- Condolences
- Consoling touch
- Grief
- Lament
- Mourning
- Shiva (Judaism)
