= Holding hands =

Form of physical intimacy

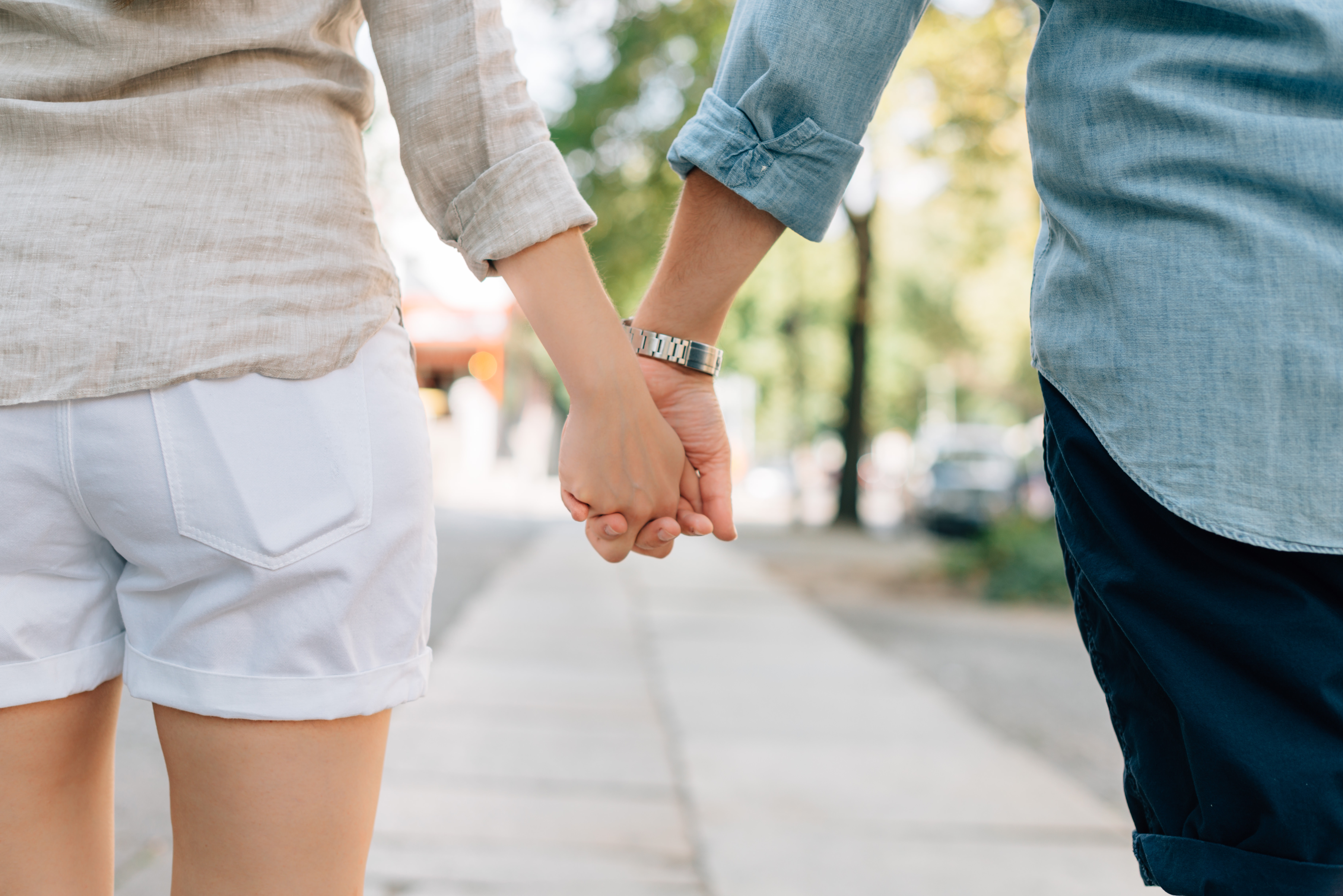
Stock photo of a couple holding hands

Holding hands is a form of physical intimacy involving two or more people. It may or may not be romantic. Couples often hold hands while walking together outdoors.

== Cultural aspects ==
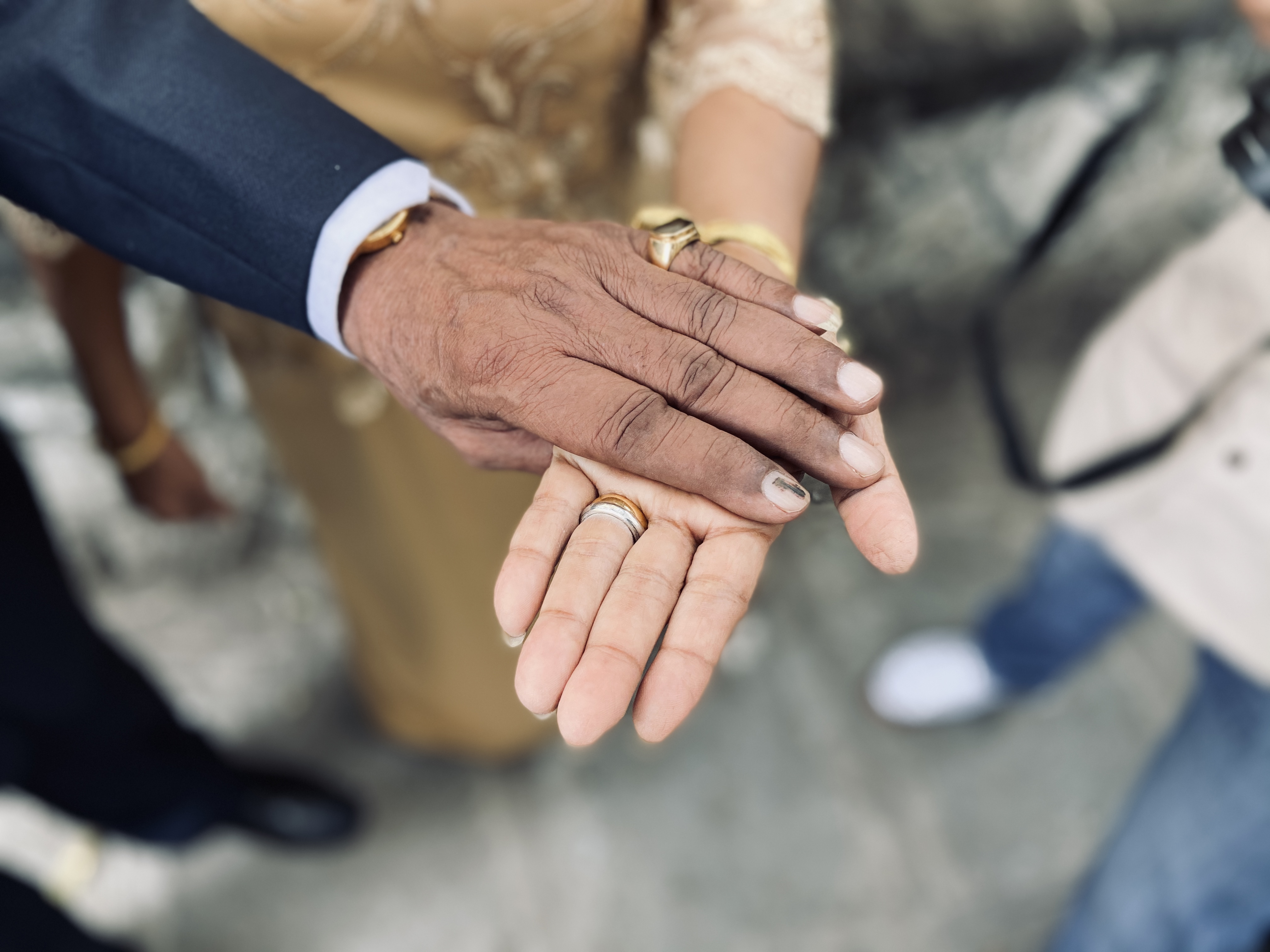
A couple holds hands on their fiftieth anniversary

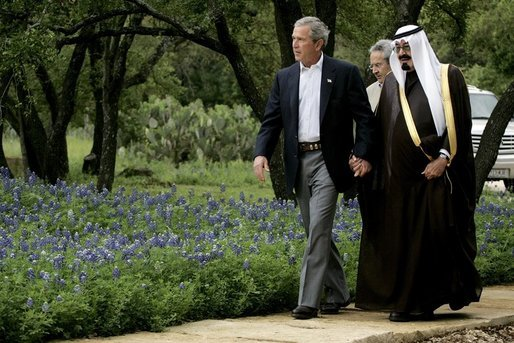
George W. Bush and future King Abdullah of Saudi Arabia holding hands

In Western culture, spouses and romantic couples often hold hands as a sign of affection or to express psychological closeness. Non-romantic friends may also hold hands, although acceptance of this varies by culture and gender role. Parents or guardians may hold the hands of small children to exercise guidance or authority. In terms of romance, handholding is often used in the early stages of dating or courtship to express romantic interest in a partner. Handholding is also common in advanced stages of a romantic relationship where it may be used to signify or seek solace and reassurance.

Same-sex couples may avoid holding hands in public due to homophobia. In 2012, an average of 74% of gay men and 51% of lesbian women responded to an EU Fundamental Rights Agency survey saying they avoid holding hands in public for fear of harassment or assault. These responses varied from 45% to 89% depending on country, with an average of 66%.

In Arab countries, North Africa, some parts of Asia and traditionally in some Mediterranean and Southern European cultures (especially in Sicily), males also hold hands for friendship and as a sign of respect; a custom which is especially noticed by societies unused to it, for instance when, in 2005, Crown Prince Abdullah of Saudi Arabia held hands with the United States President George W. Bush.

== See also ==
- Public display of affection
- Human chain
- Handshake
