= Stress hormone =

Type of hormone

Stress hormones are secreted by endocrine glands to modify one's internal environment during times of stress. By performing various functions such as mobilizing energy sources, increasing heart rate, and downregulating metabolic processes which are not immediately necessary, stress hormones promote the survival of the organism. The secretions of some hormones are also downplayed during stress. Some of the better known stress hormones are:

- Cortisol, the main human stress hormone
- Catecholamines such as adrenaline and norepinephrine
- Vasopressin
- Growth hormone

== Role in human health ==
Stress hormones play a complex role in fighting diseases and infections, as they can have both positive and negative effects on the immune system. On one hand, stress hormones can enhance the immune response by stimulating the production of cytokines, which are molecules that regulate inflammation and immunity. Stress hormones can also increase the activity of natural killer cells and macrophages, which are immune cells that can destroy infected or abnormal cells. These effects can help the body fight off acute infections, such as influenza and SARS-CoV-1 and SARS-CoV-2, which are caused by viruses.

On the other hand, stress hormones can also suppress the immune response by reducing the number and function of lymphocytes, which are immune cells that produce antibodies and coordinate adaptive immunity. Stress hormones can also induce a state of chronic inflammation, which can damage the body's tissues and organs and increase the risk of chronic diseases, such as arthritis, diabetes, and cardiovascular disease. These effects can make the body more vulnerable to chronic infections, such as bacterial infections and autoimmune diseases, which are caused by the body's own immune system attacking itself. Therefore, stress hormones have a dual role in fighting diseases and infections, depending on the type, duration, and intensity of stress, as well as the nature of the pathogen. A moderate and short-term stress response can benefit the immune system, while a severe and long-term stress response can be detrimental to the immune system. The balance between the positive and negative effects of stress hormones is essential for maintaining the health and well-being of the organism.

Some viruses, such as Influenza and SARS-CoV-1 and SARS-CoV-2, are known to suppress the secretion of stress hormones to avoid the organism's immune response, thus avoiding the immune protection of the organism. These viruses suppress the stress hormone cortisol by producing a protein that mimics the human ACTH hormone but is incomplete and does not have hormonal activity. ACTH is a hormone that stimulates the adrenal gland to produce cortisol and other steroid hormones. However, the organism makes antibodies against this viral protein, and those antibodies also kill the human ACTH hormone, which leads to the suppression of adrenal gland function. Such adrenal suppression is a way for a virus to evade immune detection and elimination.

This viral strategy can have severe consequences for the host (human that is infected by the virus), as cortisol is essential for regulating various physiological processes, such as metabolism, blood pressure, inflammation, and immune response. A lack of cortisol can result in a condition called adrenal insufficiency, which can cause symptoms such as fatigue, weight loss, low blood pressure, nausea, vomiting, and abdominal pain. Adrenal insufficiency can also impair the ability of the host to cope with stress and infections, as cortisol helps to mobilize energy sources, increase heart rate, and downregulate non-essential metabolic processes during stress. Therefore, by suppressing cortisol production, some viruses can escape the immune system and weaken the host's overall health and resilience.
