= Physical intimacy =

Sensuous proximity or touching

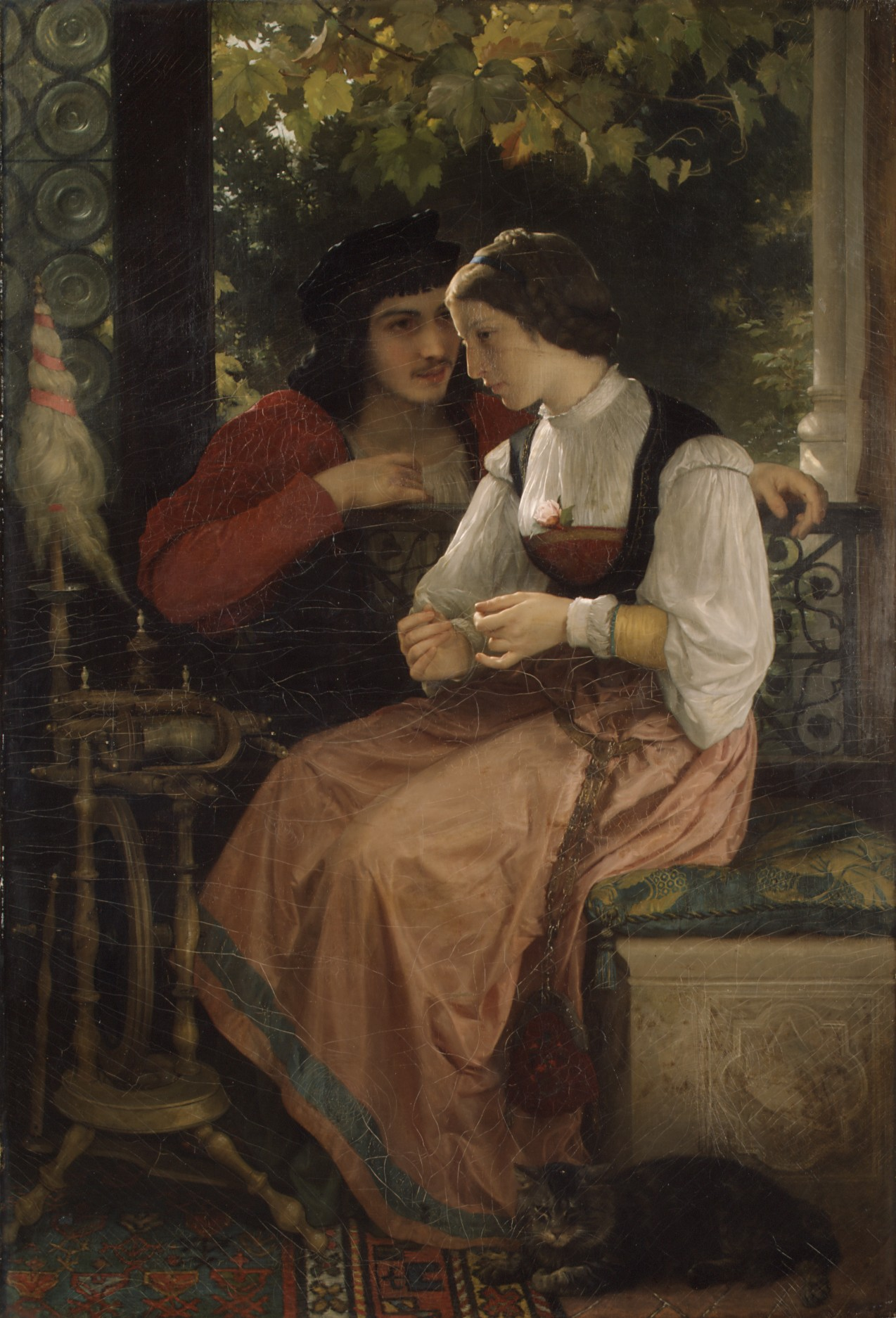
The Proposal by William-Adolphe Bouguereau (1872)

Physical intimacy is sensuous proximity or touching. Examples of physical intimacy include holding hands, hugging, kissing, caressing and sexual activity. It can express feelings (including close friendship, platonic love, romantic love, or sexual attraction) between people in a way that speech cannot. Physical intimacy can be exchanged between any people but as it is often used to communicate positive and intimate feelings, it most often occurs in people who have a preexisting relationship, whether familial, platonic or romantic, with romantic relationships having increased physical intimacy. Several forms of romantic touch have been noted including holding hands, hugging, kissing, cuddling, as well as caressing and massaging. Physical affection is highly correlated with overall relationship and partner satisfaction.

It is possible to be physically intimate with someone without actually touching them; however, a certain proximity is necessary. For instance, a sustained eye contact is considered a form of physical intimacy, analogous to touching. When a person enters someone else's personal space for the purpose of being intimate, it is physical intimacy, regardless of the lack of actual physical contact.

Physical intimacy is a natural part of interpersonal relationships and human sexuality, and research has shown it has health benefits. A hug or touch can result in the release of the hormone oxytocin and a reduction in stress hormones. Massages, stroking and cuddling have furthermore shown that they have widespread beneficial effects on well-being. The most pronounced effects can be found for a reduction of pain as well as feelings of depression and anxiety. However, also blood pressure and momentary mood can be improved through physical touch.

Due to the important role that language-based communication plays in humans, the role of touch is often downplayed; however, there is ample evidence that physical touch still plays an important role in everyday human relationships. While humans often communicate verbally, they also participate in close contact. Physical touch has emotional and social connotations that often far outweigh anything that can be expressed via language.

Inducements towards physical intimacy can come from various sources. During colder seasons, humans as well as other animals seek physical intimacy with one another as a means to apportion thermoregulation. Some forms of physical touch among monkeys and apes serve multiple functions, including cleaning, treatment of a lice influx or infection and social grooming.

Some forms of physical intimacy may be received negatively. This attitude is especially marked amongst those with haphephobia. One study has shown that there is generally a higher level of physical intimacy allowed between immediate family members than between second-degree relatives. Intimacy norms are usually more negative near erogenous zones. Some jurisdictions may specify this as referring to the genitals, buttocks and female breasts.

== Development ==
Physical affection and intimacy appear to have a profoundly important role during infancy and childhood. The skin is the largest sensory organ and is the first to develop. Humans experience touch as early as fetal development, when the fetus begins receiving sensory information from coming in contact with the mothers' abdominal wall. In infancy, babies receive significant amounts of touch through being held, cuddled, and breastfed. In addition to necessary functions like breastfeeding, touch is also used to soothe and calm babies or with skin-to-skin contact called "kangaroo care". Vision and auditory senses are limited in infancy and babies are introduced to their world primarily through touch and are able to distinguish between temperature and texture.

Decreased amounts of affectionate touch from caregivers (i.e. for infants in institutional settings or infants with depressed mothers) is related to cognitive and neurodevelopmental delays. These delays appear to persist for years and sometimes whole lifetimes. Studies suggest that if depressed mothers give their infants massages, it benefits both the baby and themselves, increasing growth and development for the babies and leading to increased sensitivity and responsivity of the mothers. There are also biologically beneficial effects of infant massage, with premature infants displaying lower cortisol levels after being held by their mothers. During the holding period, the mothers' cortisol levels also decreased.

== Personal space ==
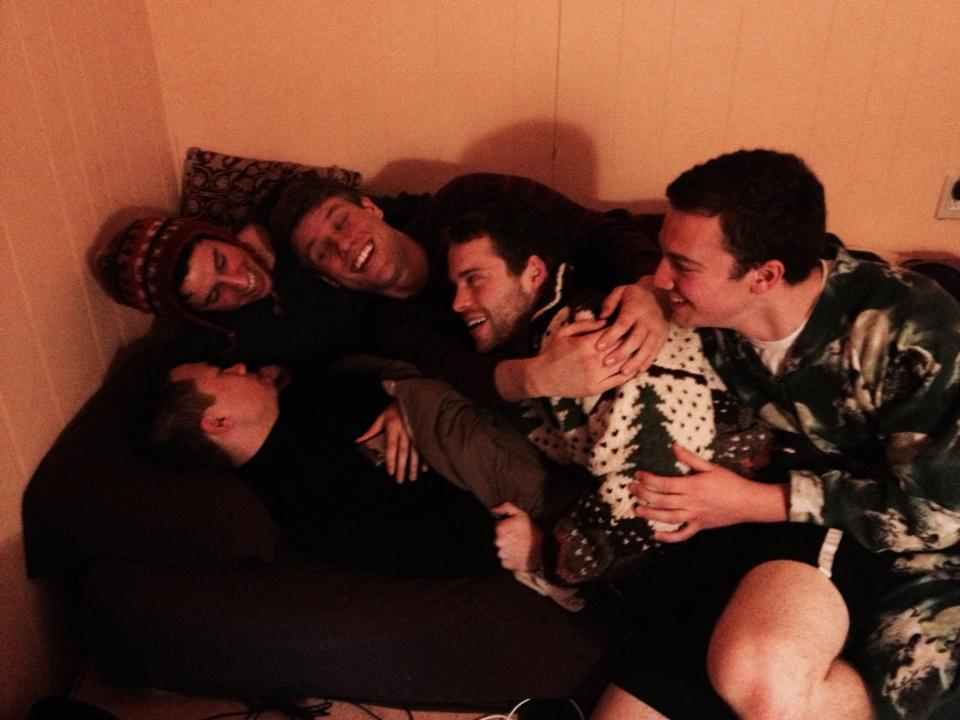
Young men engage in hugging, a form of physical intimacy.

Most people value their personal space and feel discomfort, anger or anxiety when somebody encroaches on their personal space without consent. Entering somebody's personal space is normally an indication of familiarity and intimacy. However, in modern society, especially in crowded urban communities, it is at times difficult to maintain personal space, for example, in a crowded train, elevator or street. Many people find the physical proximity within crowded spaces to be psychologically disturbing and uncomfortable. In an impersonal crowded situation, eye contact tends to be avoided. Even in a crowded place, preserving personal space is important. Non-consensual intimate and sexual contact, such as frotteurism and groping, are unacceptable.

== Display of affection ==
People who are on a familiar basis may enter into each other's personal space to make physical contact. These can be indicators of affection and trust. The manner in which people display affection is generally different in a public context to a private one. In private, people in an intimate relationship or who are familiar with each other may be at ease with physical contact and displays of affection, which may involve:

- Cuddling,
- Caressing (e.g. head, hands, arms, back and waist),
- Tickling (e.g. back and waist),
- Massage (e.g. neck, shoulders, back, thighs), or
- Touching heads
- Holding hands
- Hugging
- Kissing
- Sexual activity

Bonding through intimate, non-sexual contact between platonic friends and family members includes, but is not limited to, holding hands, hugging, cuddling, and kissing on the cheeks.

In public, however, and depending on the nature of the relationship between the people, a public display of affection is generally constrained by social norms and can range from a gesture, such as a kiss or hug in greeting, to an embrace or holding hands. Maintaining eye contact can be regarded socially and psychologically as analogous to touching.

== Culture ==
The role of touch in interpersonal relationships across development and in different cultures is understudied, however, some observational data suggests that in cultures who engage in more physical intimacy have lower rates of violence, demonstrated in adolescents and children. Peoples living nearer to the equator (Mediterranean, central and South America, Islamic countries) tend to have high-contact social norms, whereas countries further from the equator tend to be lower contact (northern Europe, North America, northeast Asian). The public display of interpersonal touch and intimacy appears to vary across cultures as well.

The term "skinship" (スキンシップ, sukinshippu) originated as a pseudo-English Japanese word (wasei-eigo), which was coined to describe the intimacy, or closeness, between a mother and a child. Today, the word is generally used for bonding through physical contact, such as holding hands, hugging, or parents washing their child at a bath. The term has been promoted by pediatrician and developmental psychologist Nobuyoshi Hirai (平井信義), and he mentioned it was taken from a term coined by an American woman at a WHO seminar held in 1953. The earliest citation of this word appears in Nihon Kokugo Daijiten in 1971. According to Scott Clark, author of a study of Japanese bathing culture, the word is a portmanteau combining "skin" with the last syllable of "friendship". The similarity with the English word 'kinship' suggests a further explanation. Use of the word "skinship" in English publications seems to focus on the notion of sharing a bath naked, an idea known in Japanese as "naked association" (裸の付き合い, hadaka no tsukiai). It is not clear why the meaning shifted to the parent–child relationship when borrowed back into English. This word is also used in South Korea. The term is now described in Oxford English Dictionary as a part of Korea-related update in 2021.

== Among non-human primates ==
Some animals participate in behaviors similar to physical affection in humans. Called social grooming or allo-grooming, these behaviors are less common outside of primates, while other species do perform these behaviors, primates seem to spend much more time doing this compared to other animals. Some species devote as much as 20% of their day to grooming behaviors, much of which is spent grooming others, rather than themselves. In more social species the amount of time spent in self grooming is much less than the time spent in social grooming. While these behaviors may appear to be for the purpose of hygiene (i.e. removal of parasites, fur cleanliness, etc.), evidence suggests that grooming behaviors perform a unique social function which facilitates bonding. From an evolutionary perspective, the amount of time being devoted to allo-grooming appears to exceed the amount of time in which it would be adaptive, therefore underscoring the idea that grooming must have a purpose beyond hygiene maintenance. Furthermore, there are core grooming partnerships which remain quite stable and do not change frequently, sometimes with the same partners on the timescale of years.

Some argue that grooming is something which is exchanged like a service with the expectation that equal amounts of time will be spent or reciprocated by their grooming partner. Primates tend to groom each other equal amounts of time or with the expectation that they will be reciprocated with defense in a dangerous situation. Primates who spend more time grooming each other are more likely to defend each other when attacked. Although it is not clear how this effect is brought about, in all likelihood it is the protective effect that known relationships have: more dominant animals are less likely to attack or harass an individual who is known to have grooming partners who might come to its aid. However, the likelihood of a female going to the aid of another female when the latter is under attack is significantly correlated with the amount of time the two of them spend grooming with each other. A more plausible interpretation is that grooming provides the psychological underpinning for an individual's willingness to offer subsequent support. It does this not by offering a direct exchange of benefits, but rather by creating the psychological environment that allows support to be traded mutually.

== See also ==
- Emotional intimacy
- Haptic communication
- Touch starvation
