= Commitment readiness =

Commitment readiness is a psychological construct that refers to an individual's subjective sense that the current time is appropriate for involvement in a committed romantic relationship. The construct was developed by social psychologists Christopher R. Agnew, Benjamin W. Hadden, and Kenneth Tan within relationship receptivity theory, which emphasizes the role of perceived timing in romantic relationship formation, maintenance, and stability. Commitment readiness is distinct from commitment to a specific partner and from commitment desirability, which concerns the extent to which an individual wants to be in a committed relationship.

The first empirical study of commitment readiness, published in 2018, examined its association with romantic relationship interest, pursuit, and formation among single people. Subsequent research has found associations between commitment readiness and relationship commitment, maintenance behaviors, and stability among those in ongoing relationships. Other studies have examined factors influencing reported readiness, such as perceptions of available romantic partners, as well as how friends perceive an individual's readiness.

== Definition and conceptualization ==
Commitment readiness refers to an individual's subjective sense that the present time is right for involvement in a committed romantic relationship. Readiness may vary over time as individuals' circumstances and priorities change, and individuals may also differ in their general level of readiness as a result of their relationship history, for example.

Within relationship receptivity theory (RRT), commitment readiness represents readiness for long-term romantic involvement. The theory identifies two components of relationship receptivity: relationship readiness and relationship desirability. Relationship readiness refers to the perceived appropriateness of being involved in a romantic relationship at a given time, whereas relationship desirability refers to the extent to which an individual wants such a relationship. Both components may be applied to short- or long-term romantic involvement. When applied to committed, long-term relationships, these constructs are termed commitment readiness and commitment desirability, respectively.

Although related, commitment readiness and commitment desirability are conceptually distinct. For example, an individual may want to be in a committed romantic relationship while perceiving that the present time may not be right. Agnew and colleagues have suggested that desirability may be a necessary precursor to readiness, since a person who does not want to be in a relationship may not need to consider whether they feel ready to be in one. RRT treats desirability as a motivational component and readiness as an individual's perceived ability to be in a relationship, including whether they currently have the skills, knowledge, or focus to enter or maintain one.

Commitment readiness is also distinguished from commitment level, which refers to an individual's psychological attachment to, long-term orientation toward, and intention to maintain a particular romantic relationship. While commitment level concerns an existing relationship, commitment readiness concerns an individual's perceived preparedness for committed romantic involvement more generally. As a result, a person may experience high commitment readiness without being in a romantic relationship, while those already in relationships may differ in the extent to which they feel ready for commitment. The distinction allows commitment readiness to be examined both before and during romantic relationships.

== Background ==
Research on romantic relationships has examined individual characteristics and relationship-specific factors to explain relationship formation, maintenance, and stability. These approaches include research on attachment orientations, relationship satisfaction, and commitment to particular partners. Temporal considerations have also been incorporated in relationship research, including studies of relationship duration, short- and long-term mating strategies, and changes in relationships over time. Agnew, Hadden, and Tan distinguished their approach from these perspectives by emphasizing individuals' subjective perceptions of whether the present time is right for romantic involvement.

Readiness as a concept had previously appeared in other areas of psychology. In learning theory, Edward Thorndike's law of readiness proposed that the readiness or unreadiness of a response influences behavior. Readiness has also featured in Jerome Bruner's theory of instruction and Albert Bandura's social learning theory. In health psychology, the transtheoretical model of behavior change distinguishes stages of readiness involved in adopting or modifying behaviors. Research on organizational development has similarly examined readiness in relation to organizational change. Agnew and colleagues noted that, to their knowledge, these theories addressed readiness only with limited reference to close relationships. They identified the transtheoretical model's treatment of readiness as a precursor to action and maintenance as particularly relevant to relationship pursuit and maintenance.

Agnew, Hadden, and Tan cited earlier relationship research as indicating that perceived readiness might be relevant to romantic involvement. In retrospective accounts from a 1989 study by Arthur Aron and colleagues and a 2010 study by Riela and colleagues, some participants identified readiness as a factor they believed had contributed to falling in love with a romantic partner. Hadden and colleagues noted that these findings were based on retrospective accounts and that it remained unclear how readiness prospectively predicted relationship development. In 2002, Sprecher and colleagues suggested that social networks might influence individuals' perceptions of readiness to form romantic relationships.

Christopher Agnew discussed relationship receptivity in an invited keynote address at the 2014 International Association for Relationship Research conference in Melbourne, Australia. Hadden, Agnew, and Tan (2018) subsequently published empirical research examining commitment readiness among single individuals. In 2019, Agnew, Hadden, and Tan reported research on individuals in ongoing romantic relationships, examining commitment, relationship maintenance, and stability. They presented the theory in a 2020 book chapter, describing the components of relationship receptivity and proposing its antecedents.

== Measurement ==
Commitment readiness is assessed using self-report questionnaires that measure individuals' perceptions of their current readiness to enter or maintain a committed romantic relationship. Agnew, Hadden, and Tan developed an eight-item Commitment Readiness Scale, which asks respondents to indicate their agreement with statements such as "I feel ready to be involved in a committed relationship" and "Now is not the time for me to be involved in a committed romantic relationship." Individuals rate their agreement on a scale ranging from 0 (completely disagree) to 8 (completely agree), where higher composite scores indicate greater commitment readiness. Some daily diary studies have used an abbreviated four-item version. Additionally, commitment desirability is measured with a separate scale developed by Tan, Agnew, and Hadden.

== Research ==
==== Relationship formation ====
Research on commitment readiness has examined its association with romantic relationship initiation, including individuals' interest in pursuing relationships, their relationship-seeking behaviors, and relationship formation.

Hadden, Agnew, and Tan investigated these associations in a 2018 study of five independent samples of single people. In two cross-sectional studies, greater commitment readiness was associated with wanting to be closer to a hypothetical partner. Effect sizes and significance levels varied across analyses. They also found that readiness was distinct from fear of being single or attachment avoidance.

In a 14-day diary study with 216 undergraduate students, commitment readiness was associated with greater interest in dating and forming relationships with specific potential partners. Participants also reported more behaviors intended to facilitate relationship initiation, including flirting and other initiation tactics, on days when they experienced greater readiness. Moreover, time-lagged analyses showed that higher readiness on one day predicted greater relationship interest and attention to appearance on the following day, but did not significantly predict relationship initiation behavior. Some analyses also found that some relationship cognitions and pursuit behaviors on one day predicted increases in next-day readiness, which the authors interpreted as suggesting a bidirectional association.

Hadden, Agnew, and Tan also examined whether commitment readiness predicted actual relationship formation using three longitudinal samples, with follow-up periods ranging from five weeks to seven months. A combined analysis found that greater initial readiness was associated with a higher likelihood of entering a romantic relationship during the follow-up period. The relationship was statistically significant in one sample, marginally significant in another, and nonsignificant in the third. In the sample with the significant result, only 2 of the 51 participants who reported not being attracted to anyone at the start of the study entered a relationship, compared with 49 of the 162 who reported being attracted to someone. The authors noted that readiness predicted relationship formation only among participants who could identify a potential partner. For those who formed a relationship during the follow-up periods, higher readiness while single was associated with greater commitment, satisfaction, and investment. Satisfaction and investment mediated the link between readiness and later commitment.

==== Relationship maintenance and stability ====
Commitment readiness has also been examined in relation to commitment levels, relationship maintenance behaviors, and relationship stability among individuals already in romantic relationships.

In a 2019 study, Agnew, Hadden, and Tan found that commitment readiness was associated with relationship commitment, maintenance processes, and behaviors directed toward ending a relationship across five samples. Readiness was associated with higher commitment over and above satisfaction, quality of alternatives, and investment (the predictors of commitment in the investment model), and predicted increases in commitment over two months. In daily diary data, readiness on one day predicted higher commitment the next day, whereas commitment and the investment model variables did not predict next-day readiness. Specifically, the researchers examined three types of maintenance behavior: self-disclosure, accommodation, and sacrifice. Self-disclosure involves communicating personal information to a partner, and readiness was associated with more self-disclosure. Accommodation refers to the willingness to inhibit destructive reactions and respond constructively when a partner has behaved in a potentially destructive way. Rusbult and colleagues distinguished four ways of responding to such behaviors: exit (actively harming or ending the relationship), voice (actively trying to improve conditions), loyalty (passively waiting for conditions to improve), and neglect (passively letting the relationship deteriorate). In a cross-sectional sample, readiness was not associated with overall accommodation, but it was associated with less neglect, marginally less exit, and less loyalty. The authors interpreted this as suggesting that more ready individuals avoid destructive responses but do not passively wait for things to improve. As for sacrifice, those higher in overall readiness reported making more daily sacrifices, though day-to-day changes in readiness did not predict whether a sacrifice occurred.

Readiness also strengthened the association between commitment and maintenance: commitment was more strongly associated with self-disclosure and accommodation among participants higher in readiness. In daily diary data, readiness strengthened the day-to-day association of commitment with self-disclosure and sacrifice, but only at marginal significance.

The researchers also found that commitment readiness moderated the association between commitment level and behaviors directed toward leaving a relationship. Leave behavior was coded as whether the participants reported responsibility for ending their relationship by follow-ups five to seven months later. Those who were still in their relationship at the follow-up were coded as not leaving. Participants who reported both higher commitment and greater readiness were the least likely to engage in leave behaviors. Commitment was associated with less leave behavior among participants high in readiness but not among those low in readiness. The authors concluded that although commitment to a partner is necessary for maintaining a relationship, individuals also benefit from feeling ready for commitment at that time.

==== Antecedents and correlates of commitment readiness ====
Relationship receptivity theory proposes three groups of factors that may influence receptivity, including past relationship experiences, personal preferences and expectations, and outside pressures from friends and family. A person may not feel ready to be in a relationship, for example, due to not being over a recent breakup or because they are currently focused on their career.

====== Perceived partner availability ======
In a 2022 study, Brady and colleagues examined whether perceptions of available romantic partners influence commitment readiness across five studies involving single individuals. An initial correlational study found that participants who expected to have more potential romantic partners reported lower commitment readiness. Across four subsequent experiments manipulating participants' perceptions of their romantic opportunities, participants led to believe they had more available options reported lower readiness than those who were led to believe they had fewer options. Additionally, participants led to believe they had more available partners were more selective when rating potential dates, and mediation analyses provided initial evidence that selectivity may partly account for lower readiness.

====== Attachment orientations and interpersonal perceptions ======
Among single individuals, Hadden and colleagues found that self-reported readiness was modestly negatively correlated with attachment avoidance and positively correlated with fear of being single. In a 2025 study of 193 groups of four friends (722 people), Yang and colleagues found strong agreement between individuals' ratings of their own commitment readiness and their friends' ratings of them. People perceived as higher in attachment avoidance or anxiety were also perceived as less ready for commitment. Individuals' judgments of their own readiness were also related to how ready they judged their friends to be.

== Limitations ==
Research on commitment readiness has used cross-sectional, longitudinal, daily diary, and experimental designs. Hadden and colleagues found that individuals higher in readiness were more likely to think about, pursue, and enter into relationships, but stated that other factors could not be ruled out as explanations for these findings. The authors described their readiness measure as broad and unidimensional, and suggested that readiness may have multiple facets, such as an individual's perceived ability to be in a relationship. Participants in Agnew and colleagues' studies were largely young adults who reported relatively high readiness, and readiness was measured in only one partner per couple.
