= Effects of divorce =

Divorce can affect both the people getting divorced and any children they may have in both the short and long term. After a divorce, the couple often experiences effects including decreased levels of happiness, a change in economic status, and emotional problems. The effects on children can include academic, behavioral, and psychological problems. Studies suggest that children with divorced parents are more likely to exhibit such behavioral issues than those with non-divorced parents.

== Effect on children ==
The impact of divorce on children – Tamara D. Afifi at a TED talk

A longitudinal study by Judith Wallerstein reports the long-term negative effects of divorce on children.

Linda Waite analyzed the relationship between marriage, divorce, and happiness using the National Survey of Family and Households and found that unhappily married families who had divorced were no happier than those who had stayed together. One broad-based study also shows that people have an easier time recovering after the death of a parent as opposed to a divorce. This study reported that children who lose a parent are usually able to attain the same level of happiness that they had before the death, whereas children of divorced parents are often not able to attain the same level of happiness that they had before the divorce.

=== Development and behavior ===
A child affected by divorce at an early age will show effects later in life. Children can be affected socially; they may seem to become defiant in certain aspects. In heavy research, many have seen children become isolated after experiencing their parents' divorce. Children soon decide they should start growing up much quicker than they need to due to the amount of stress they have taken on. They may make premature transitions to adulthood, such as leaving home or parenting their own child early. It is believed that this type of attitude and action occur due to the children feeling they are the reason why their parents split. Recent authors have argued that a major cost to children comes long after they attempt to form stable marriages themselves. Parental divorce leads a child to have lower trust in future relationships. Compared with children of always-married parents, children of divorced parents have more positive attitudes towards divorce and less favorable attitudes towards marriage.

=== Mental health ===
According to some, custody arrangements after a parent's separation or divorce can be beneficial to the child, as long as both parties are willing to cooperate. According to most, the children of divorced parents have also been reported as more likely to have behavioral problems than children of married parents and are more likely to suffer abuse than children in intact families. When parental conflict is continuous, it can cause problems for the child and become harmful to them. This type of conflict causes harm because it can be frightening and cause the child to be torn or stuck in the middle, as well as forcing the child to deal with inconsistent parenting, which can cause each parent to undermine each other. Because of these conflicts, the parents are not able to meet the child's needs, hurting the child's overall well-being and mental health.

=== Physical health ===
A 2015 article updated and confirmed the findings in a 2002 article in Clinical Child and Family Psychology Review. Both articles discuss a variety of health consequences for the children of divorced parents. Studies have claimed that people who have been in divorced families have higher rates of alcoholism and other substance abuse compared to those who have never been divorced. Robert H. Coombs, Professor of Behavioral Sciences at UCLA, reviewed over 130 studies measuring how marital status affects personal well-being. Researchers have also shown that children of divorced or separated parents have higher rates of clinical depression, family disruption, and low socioeconomic status in early childhood, increasing the long-term risk for major depression. Children of divorced or separated parents also seek formal psychiatric care at higher rates, are more likely to die by suicide, acute infectious diseases, digestive illnesses, parasitic diseases, respiratory illnesses, and severe injuries, and have lower life expectancies in men. Other issues include increased risk of cancer, strokes, heart problems, rheumatoid arthritis, and osteoarthritis. Having divorced parents can also cause an increased risk of arthritis for children later in life and lower levels of the hormone oxytocin in adulthood.

=== Views on divorce ===
In contrast to the usual negative views on marriage by children affected by it, Constance Ahrons, in We're Still Family: What Grown Children Have to Say About Their Parents' Divorce, interviewed 98 divorced families' children for numerous subjects and found a few of the children saying, "I saw some of the things my parents did and know not to do that in my marriage and see the way they treated each other and know not to do that to my spouse and my children. I know [the divorce] has made me more committed to my husband and my children." In the book For Better or For Worse: Divorce Reconsidered, Mavis Hetherington reports that not all kids fare so badly and that divorce can help children living in high-conflict homes, such as those with domestic violence. A peaceful divorce has less of an impact on children than a contested divorce.

Contrary to some of the previous research, those with divorced parents were no more likely than those from intact families to regard divorce positively or to see it as an easy way of solving the problem of a failing marriage. Members of both groups felt that divorce should be avoided but that it was also a necessary option when a relationship could not be rescued. A study by Wolfinger, N. H. (2011), titled "More Evidence for Trends in the Intergenerational Transmission of Divorce", attempted to understand the validity of this socially held claim. In essence, the study attempts to find evidence as to whether divorce transmission (or the likeliness of a child of divorce being a higher predictor of personal divorce) is still relevant in today’s climate. Their research uses data from the General Social Survey (GSS) (Davis & Smith, 2007). To randomize the research, an adult was chosen from each home between the ages of 18 and 89. Data was collected between the years 1973 and 1994, and individuals were chosen only if 30 years had passed since they were initially married, which ended up being a sample of 7,226 individuals. Interestingly, the study finds "clear evidence of a decline in divorce transmission" and it "demonstrates that divorced people die younger; it has also been shown that parental divorce decreases life expectancy." These findings also support claims made in the mortality section. However, the study did show that "the divorce cycle is strongest for people who experience multiple family structure transitions in their families of origin", or rather, recurring parental divorces. To summarize, divorce transmission, according to this study, is in fact generally declining. Where there is exposure to multiple divorces, however, an increased rate of transmission is seen.

== Uncontested divorce ==
An uncontested divorce is a divorce decree that neither party is fighting. Over 40% of American children will experience parental divorce or separation during their childhood. In a study of the effect of relocation after a divorce, researchers found that parents relocating far away from each other (with either both moving or one moving) has a long-term effect on children. Researchers found major differences in divorced families in which one parent moved away from the child; the children (as college students) received less financial support from their parents compared with divorced families in which neither parent moved. The children also felt more distress related to the divorce and did not feel a sense of emotional support from their parents. A parental divorce influences a child’s behavior in a negative manner, which leads to anger, frustration, and depression. This negative behavior is cast outward in their academic and personal lives. Relocating is defined as when a parent moves more than an hour away from their children. Children of divorces where both parents stayed close together did not have these negative effects.

== Mortality ==
In a study titled "Divorce and Death: Forty Years of the Charleston Heart Study", the impact of divorce on the adult lifespan following separation is explored. To achieve this, the research team surveyed a sample of more than 1,300 adults, who were periodically checked in between 1960 and 2000. According to Sbarra (2009), the study found that "participants who were separated or divorced at the start of the study evidenced significantly elevated rates of early mortality, and these results held after adjusting for baseline health status and other demographic variables." These findings suggest that a key predictor of early death is the amount of time people live as recipients of divorce. Let it be noted that mortality was not as negatively affected if the individual remarried. This article (although stand-alone) may hold value as it expresses the physiological impacts of divorce on the individual, which resolve into diminished lifespans.

== See also ==
- Adverse childhood experiences
- Cost of raising a child
- Fear of commitment
- Single parent
- Single person
