= Saxbe =

Saxbe is a surname. Notable people with the surname include:

- Darby Saxbe, American psychologist
- William B. Saxbe (1916–2010), American diplomat and politician
  - Saxbe fix
