= Fear of commitment =

Irrational fear or avoidance of long-term partnership or marriage

Fear of commitment, also known as gamophobia, is the irrational fear or avoidance of long-term partnership or marriage. The term is sometimes used interchangeably with commitment phobia, which describes a generalized fear or avoidance of commitments more broadly.

In essence, despite deriving satisfaction from companionship in a relationship, people may choose to distance themselves and withdraw if the relationship progresses to a serious level of commitment.

== Psychological explanations ==
Fear of commitment represents a multifaceted psychological phenomenon, susceptible to influence by numerous factors, with psychological elements playing a significant role as primary contributors. Below are a few potential causes of the fear of commitment in long term relationships:

=== Attachment insecurity ===
Attachment insecurity is defined by inadequate and ambivalent caregiving during infancy. Such experiences are highly likely to result in the development of insecure attachment styles, which encompass the ways individuals engage with others in intimate relationships. The concept of attachment styles originates from Bowlby's Attachment Theory, positing that individuals have an evolutionary need to establish close emotional bonds with significant others. The internal working model, shaped by early attachment experiences, establishes a stable blueprint where the relationships formed with caregivers in infancy serve as a basis for predicting future adult relationships. This asserts an ongoing influence on an individual's subsequent emotional stability and development, illustrated by the continuity hypothesis.

In the upbringing of individuals with an anxious-avoidant attachment style during childhood, parents often fail to express approval of intimate emotions from the child, leading to a gradual development of increased emotional distance and dismissiveness. This is evidenced by the maternal sensitivity hypothesis, where children’s avoidance is primarily resulted by treatments of caregivers, usually the mothers. In many instances, children experiencing this pattern are likely to acclimate to such dynamics, ultimately fostering an avoidant-dismissive attachment style in adulthood. Consequently, these individuals tend to retain bonds and close relationships on the surface while erecting emotional barriers when others attempt to delve into their deeper emotional realms. Stemming directly from a dismissive upbringing, where children learned that intimate relationships and significant others are unreliable, closeness and reassurance in interpersonal interactions is generally avoided by them. The fear of commitment in long-term relationships or marriage manifests as individuals harbour concerns that their potential partners may resemble the unreliable caregivers from their childhood, exemplifying the lasting impact of their early attachment experiences. Research has demonstrated a significant correlation between avoidance and commitment aversion, meaning that the higher the avoidance, the lower the commitment level in relationships. The low level of commitment is due to the fear caused by discomfort with dependence.

==== Social psychology research ====
Hazan and Shaver (1987) conducted a social experiment extending attachment theory to explaining how the different attachment styles influence adult romantic relationships. They designed a love quiz to ask about participants’ childhood attachment styles and their beliefs on love. 620 replied and they concluded that the majority of individuals who are securely attached as infants are having joyful and enduring relationships. Another notable application revealed that individuals with avoidant attachment styles often exhibit discomfort with emotional intimacy and a preference for independence. This aversion to closeness and commitment can contribute to a heightened fear of long-term commitment, as these individuals may struggle with the vulnerability and emotional investment inherent in enduring relationships. In addition, anxious-resistant attachment style is characterised by concerns about abandonment and a constant need for reassurance. Individuals with this attachment style may also be afraid to commit since the perceived risk of rejection or unmet emotional needs can create hesitancy in committing to a long-term partnership. This therefore supported the claim that attachment styles, especially insecure attachment, can explain fear of commitment to a certain extent.

=== Past experiences ===
Past relationships, particularly those involving trauma or having a sorrowful ending, can increase the likelihood of individuals developing a fear of commitment. They might become hesitant to invest emotionally in new relationships, fearing that their partner won't reciprocate the same level of commitment or may betray their trust. Research has consistently concluded that people's decisions to repeat behaviors are significantly influenced by their perceptions of past experiences. When faced with the prospect of commitment, individuals may find themselves contending with past fears - a phenomenon intricately connected to their earlier encounters. In other words, because of a history of others failing them, individuals tend to associate commitment with negative perceptions. This inclination leads them to adopt a pattern of commitment aversion, characterised by a reluctance to engage in behaviors that foster commitment and instead resort to actions that obstruct its development.

=== Low self-esteem and self-confidence ===
Self-esteem constitutes an affective evaluation of one’s own worth, values or importance. It is positively correlated to self-worth, signifying that individuals who perceive themselves as lacking in existential value and affection from others are less likely to possess high self-esteem. Since formation and commitment of relationships are profoundly influenced by self-worth and interpersonal trust, a fear of commitment may consequently ensue. This is rooted in the belief that they are inadequately equipped to fulfill the needs of their partner, leading to a lack of confidence in sustaining a positive, healthy, and long-lasting relationship. The resultant diminished commitment fosters an unfavorable conclusion to the relationship, thus establishing a cyclical pattern wherein this experience becomes a distressing component of their past, negatively reinforcing their fear and intensifying the phobia.

=== Unpleasant family divorce ===
Divorce within families serves as a concrete illustration frequently employed by divorced parents to underscore the "reality of marriage." This stems from the fact that divorced parents often hold more pessimistic attitudes toward marriage, expressing low optimism regarding the feasibility of enduring relationships and healthy marital state. Children of such parents inevitably absorb these perspectives, forming a biased foundational belief during childhood that couples lack the capacity to surmount conflicts. This developmental stage serves as a crucial period for the establishment of a general schema. Studies indicate that, especially among women, there exists a tendency toward reduced confidence and heightened ambivalence when contemplating commitment to a specific partner.

== History ==
The term "commitmentphobia" was coined in the popular self-help book Men Who Can't Love in 1987. Following criticism that the idea was sexist, implying only men were commitmentphobic, the authors provided a more gender balanced model of commitmentphobia in a later work, He's Scared, She's Scared (1995). When aversion to marriage involves fear, it's called "scottophobia". Hatred of marriage is "misogamy".

== Criticism ==
Besides the common criticisms of self-help, psychologist Bella M. DePaulo has written books on singlism such as Singlism: What it is, why it matters and how to stop it and Singled Out on the stigmatization of single people.

The use of the term "fear" or "phobia" imparts an inherent linguistic bias. It recasts specific lifestyle decisions (such as bachelorhood vs. marriage, or a conscious decision to remain childfree) implicitly as generalised, irrational phobias while failing to identify, describe or address an individual's specific motives. For instance, the men's rights movement, citing high divorce rates and expensive alimony and legal costs, speaks not in terms of a "fear of commitment" but of a "marriage strike" to reflect their position that non-marriage is an entirely valid, logical position based on rational consideration of the economic factors involved.

A study found increased avoidance of commitment with increasing quality of non-commitment, in line with the Rusbult's investment model of commitment.

== See also ==
- 4B movement
- Attachment and health
- Bachelor
- Child custody
- Divorce
- Economics of marriage
- Implications of divorce
- Lad culture
- MGTOW
- Old maid
- Sexual revolution
