= Family disruption =

Event which disrupts the structure of individual families

Events that disrupt the structure of individual families include legal separation and divorce, parental death, out of home placement, and military deployment. Researchers have been studying the effects on youth for decades. Some studies suggest that juveniles who have experienced more family disruptions are at a higher risk of delinquency, drug use, negative personality traits, anxiety, academic hardship, lack of social mobility, lack of personality development and depression in adulthood.

== Effects of family disruption ==
=== Delinquency and drug use ===
Studies have associated family disruption to delinquency and drug use. According to a study conducted in 1999 by the Office of Juvenile Justice and Delinquency Prevention (OJJDP) that studied the relationship between family types and levels of delinquency/drug use, the greater number of times children live through a divorce, the more delinquent they become. Family transitions put the children at an increased risk for conflict and behavioral problems. The data suggests that these constant changes stir up emotions that lead to wrongdoings.

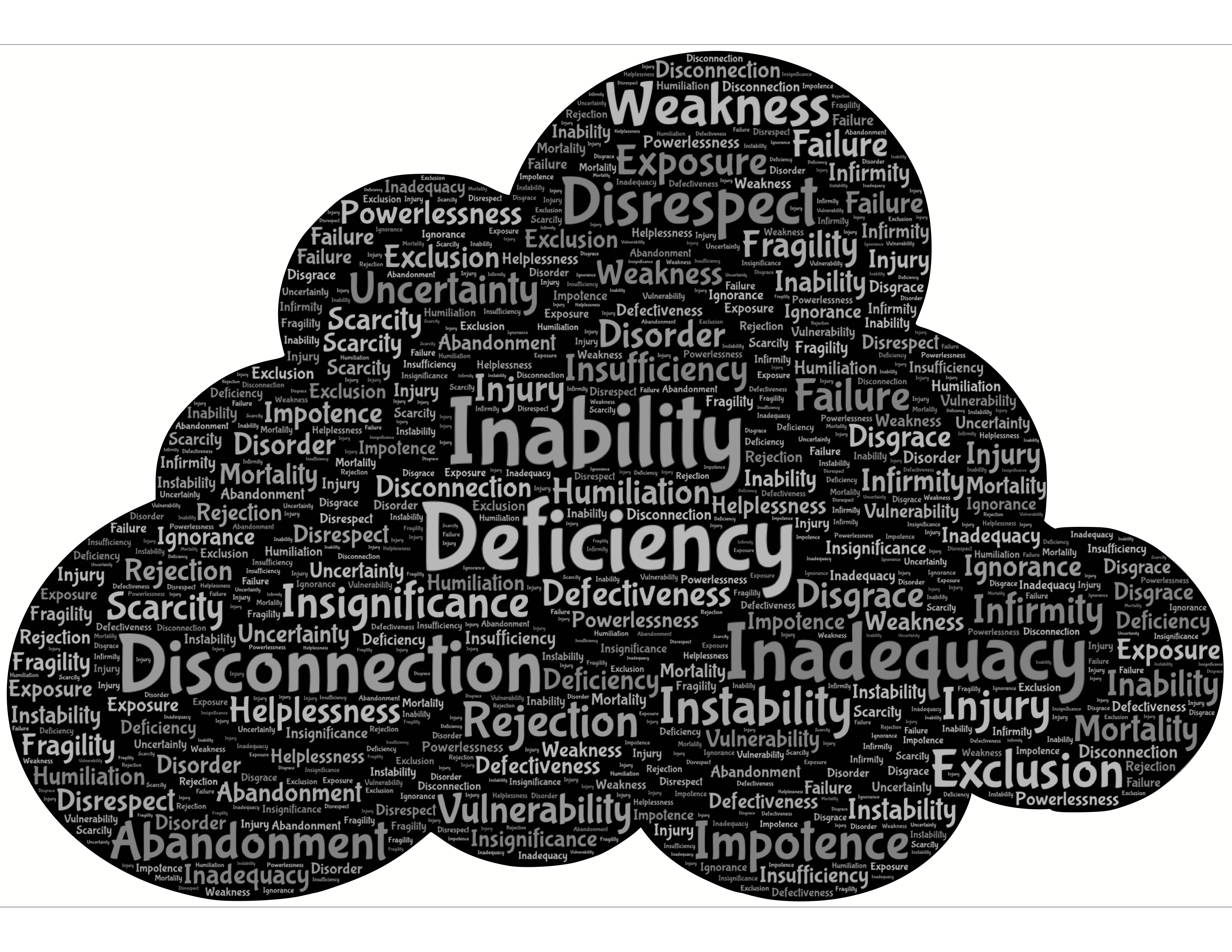
Emotions associated with anxiety.

=== Anxiety ===
Family disruption has been linked to anxiety and depression in various studies. A study conducted in Rochester, NY compared levels of anxiety and depression in elementary children with married and unmarried parents and found that children with divorced parents have a much higher risk of anxiety. These children of divorce face a period of change and uncertainty which disrupts their sense of security. Researchers believe divorce brings upon heightened concerns of security, loyalty, and fears of losing a parent. In addition, high levels of anxiety have a greater potential of impacting behavior and success in school.

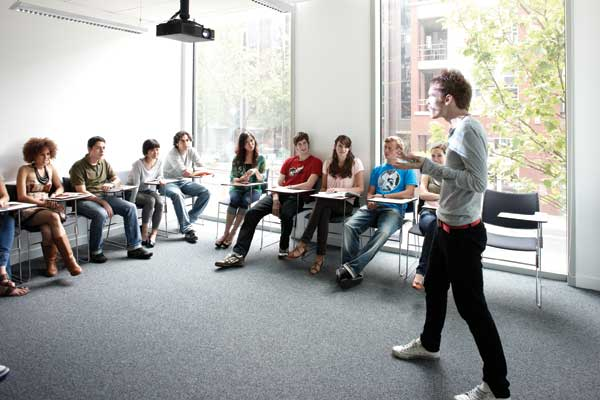
Students sitting in a classroom.

=== Education ===
Family disruption has been shown to influence academic achievement. In a study conducted in Detroit, researchers followed the lives of hundreds of adolescent participants, measuring how their various family types impact education. Results show that children had a higher academic performance in households with married parents. In addition, the study revealed that the father's involvement in the child's schoolwork played a critical role in increasing performance.

In contrast, a 2009 Norwegian study reported very little association between family disruption and educational achievement. In this study, researchers expected to find a correlation due to the potential lack of parenting and academic involvement.

=== Personality development ===
Studies have shown that family disruption impacts personality development. In an analysis on a longitudinal survey from 1970, researchers found that self-esteem, high sense of control over one's own life, and low behavioral problems positively develop between the ages 10–16. However, the results showed that children who experience a family disruption between these ages make less progress, experiencing lower self esteem, a low sense of control over their lives, and more behavioral problems. Researchers also found that the older the children experience a family disruption, the less detrimental these effects are.

=== Social mobility ===
A study conducted at the University of Southern California and the University of Washington in 1993, found that family disruption impacts boys’ social and economic development into adulthood. Men who experienced family disruptions lacked opportunities to move to the upper class and acquire inheritable wealth. These parents lose the ability to positively impact their sons’ adjustment in their professional life.

=== Depression ===
Research has shown that divorce greatly impacts depression into adulthood. A study measuring the lifetime impact of a mother's divorce on her offspring found that adults ran twice the risk of depression if their families were separated by age 7 compared to families with married parents. The risk of depression increased if the participants lived through immense tension between their parents. The high risk of depression is certain, however, researchers are unsure if it is attributable to the parental conflict or the act of the parents separating. Depression with suicidal ideation is also common.

== See also ==
- Effects of divorce
- Marital separation
- Shared parenting
- Child custody
- Out-of-home placements and trauma
