= Committed relationship =

Type of interpersonal relationship

A committed relationship is an interpersonal relationship based upon agreed-upon commitment to one another involving love, trust, honesty, openness, or some other behavior. Forms of committed relationships include close friendship, intimate relationships, engagement, marriage, and civil unions.

== Committed romantic and/or sexual relationships ==
- Marriage: a legal, religious, and social binding between people.
- Monogamy: having a single long-term romantic and sexual partner
  - Ménage à trois: having a domestic arrangement with three people sharing romantic or sexual relations; typically a traditional marriage along with another committed individual, usually a woman
- Polyamory: encompasses a wide range of relationships; polyamorous relationships may include both committed and casual relationships.
- Group marriage: marital arrangement where three or more adults enter marriage
- Sexual fidelity: not having other sexual partners other than one's committed partner, even temporarily

== Non-romantic and/or non-sexual committed relationships ==
- Family: a group of people related by consanguinity or affinity
- Friendship: certain kinds of friendships are committed, such as best friends forever, bromance, blood brother, and womance
- Queerplatonic relationship: a relationship considered as explicitly committed as a romantic relationship, but with different feelings behind it

== See also ==
- Attachment in adults – Application of the theory of attachment to adults
- Attachment theory – Psychological ethological theory
- Attachment and health – Relationship between attachment theory and personal health
- Fear of commitment – Irrational fear or avoidance of long-term partnership or marriage
- Going steady – Exclusive romance
- Hookup culture: a culture encouraging numerous and sometimes anonymous sexual partners
- Human bonding – Process of development of a close, interpersonal relationship
- Investment model of commitment – Predictive psychology theory about why people remain in relationships
- Open relationship: having a partner without excluding other romantic or sexual involvement
- Open marriage: marital arrangement where partners agree that each may engage in extramarital sexual or romantic relationships
- Polygamy: having multiple married partners
  - Polyandry: having multiple married male partners
  - Polygyny: having multiple married female partners
- Promiscuity: having casual sexual partners at will (compare with chastity)
- Relationship anarchy: having relationships that develop as an agreement between those involved, rather than according to predetermined rules or norms.
- Serial monogamy: having a series of monogamous relationships, one after the other
- Sexual infidelity: having a sexual relationship without a commitment to have no other sexual partners
- Shipping: followers of either real-life people or fictional characters to be in a romantic or sexual relationship
- Love–hate relationship: intense simultaneous or alternating emotions of love and hate, a committed frenemy or sibling rivalry
