= Relationship quality =

Perceived quality of close relationship

Relationship quality refers to the perceived quality of a close relationship (i.e., romantic relationship, friendship, or family).

Relationship quality (sometimes used interchangeably with relationship satisfaction, relationship flourishing, or relationship happiness), in the context of close interpersonal relationships is generally defined as a reflection of a couple's overall feelings towards their relationship. More simply, it is the extent to which members in a relationship (romantic or otherwise) view their relationship as positive or negative.

The determinant of relationship quality is often a variety of self-reported evaluations of traits that make up relationship quality. For instance, feelings of closeness may be measured via questions that ask an individual to rate the extent to which they identify with statements. I.e., "I feel close to my partner", "I am comfortable sharing personal thoughts and feelings with my partner", etc. These questions are typically asked on a Likert scale and the average of those scores represents an individual's feelings of closeness toward their partner. Some scales are considered unidimensional and attempt to directly measure the construct of relationship quality. Other scales, considered multidimensional, repeat this process for other hypothesized components (e.g., closeness and satisfaction) before aggregating dimensions into a representative "relationship quality" score.

Historically, relationship quality has been the most commonly studied in the context of intimate romantic relationships. More recently, the study of relationship quality has extended to include other types of close relationships (see: friendships, family, sibling, parent). There is not always agreement among scholars about what domains should be included in the measurement of relationship quality, even within the different types of close relationships. Despite this, relationship quality and its predictors have been of popular interest to relationship scholars due to the range of psychological and relational outcomes that high quality relationships have been positively linked and associated with.

== In romantic relationships ==
=== Measurement ===
Most early literature attempted to measure romantic relationship quality by centering around two approaches. While both used self-reports of how individuals perceived their relationships, the first attempted to quantify observable behaviors of relationship quality (e.g., frequency of conflict, engagement in relationship maintenance behaviors, time spent together) while the second focused on assessing internal perceptions of the relationship (e.g., perceived feelings of commitment, passion, or trust). Today, many scales measuring relationship quality focus on the second approach, attempting to identify different psychological 'domains', 'dimensions', or 'constructs' that represent relationship quality as a whole when combined.

==== Proposed dimensions of romantic relationship quality ====
Though there is differing agreement among scholars, some of the common dimensions thought to underlie relationship quality include: satisfaction, commitment, trust, closeness, intimacy, passion, independence, and relationship flourishing.

Some of the psychometric scales most commonly used by scholars to measure relationship quality in romantic couples include:

1. Quality of Marriage Index (QMI):
  1. A unidimensional scale of relationship quality which uses 6 questions designed to directly measure relationship quality. Example items include: "My relationship with my partner is very stable", "We have a good relationship", "I really feel like part of a team with my partner".
2. Perceived Relationship Quality Components (PRQC):
  1. A multidimensional scale that conceptualizes relationship quality as being made up of relationship satisfaction, commitment, intimacy, trust, passion, and love.
3. Relationship Flourishing Scale (RFS):
  1. Developed by Blaine J. Fowers and others in order to address concerns that measures of relationship quality overly focused on individual perceptions of closeness or satisfaction without considering the growth of the relationship. The Relationship Flourishing Scale contains 12 questions used to assess meaning, personal growth, relational giving, and goal sharing within the relationship.
4. Couple Satisfaction Index (CSI):
  1. A 32 question measure of overall relationship satisfaction that also has shorter 16 item (CSI-16) and 4 item (CSI-4) versions. Example items include: "Do you enjoy your partner's company?", "How rewarding is your relationship with your partner?", "In general, how often do you think that things between you and your partner are going well?".

=== Outcomes of relationship quality in romantic couples ===
A substantive body of work has focused on the importance of high quality romantic relationships being linked to physical and physiological health outcomes. Those in high quality relationships are less likely to be diagnosed with or symptomatic for generalized anxiety disorder, post-traumatic stress disorder, major depressive disorder, or bipolar disorder. Those who perceive their relationship as being higher quality are typically happier, less stressed, and more satisfied with life when compared to those in low quality relationships. Relationships have also been consistently shown to contribute strongly to physical health with higher relationship quality in couples being associated with positive outcomes ranging from increased self-reported health ratings to decreased mortality, increased cardiovascular functioning, and increased wound healing rates.

== In friendships ==
Like the composition of romantic relationship quality, friendship quality refers to the quality of a person's individual friendships. While friendship quality has not been studied as extensively as research on romantic relationship quality, studies have been conducted to define friendship quality and examinations on its psychological and physiological benefits.

Emotional closeness, communication, and trust are also widely recognized as important components of friendship quality, as they help strengthen interpersonal bonds. Individuals who openly share their thoughts and feelings with friends are more likely to develop deeper and more meaningful connections. Effective communication can reduce misunderstandings and support conflict resolution, while trust allows friends to rely on one another for emotional support. These factors contribute to higher levels of intimacy and mutual understanding between individuals. As a result, friendships that include these elements tend to be more satisfying and long-lasting.

As is the case in the study of romantic relationships, the precise components of friendship quality are not unanimously agreed upon by friendship researchers. Generally, a high-quality friendship is conceptualized as a friendship where both members engage in high, approximately equal, levels of prosocial behavior and feel comfortable in relying on one another as sources of social support. Research on friendship quality tends to be separated into the study of adolescent friendships and the study of adult friendships.

=== Adolescent friendships ===
The most common scale of adolescent friendship quality, the Friendship Qualities Scale, is composed of five dimensions: companionship, conflict, help, security, and closeness. Friendship quality in adolescents has been linked with increased self-esteem, decreased loneliness, better peer adjustment in schools, and more ability to cope with stress. One investigation of adolescent friendships found that adolescents, age 12, who felt they had a high-quality best friend showed better sympathetic nervous system reactions to social rejections than those with lower quality friendships. Other studies have further shown the importance of high-quality adolescent friendships to mental health, with children in high-quality friendships consistently reporting better mental health outcomes such as increased psychological well-being, increased psychological resilience, reduced anxiety, and reduced depressive symptoms.

=== Adult friendships ===
==== Measuring friendship quality in adults ====
Research on friendship quality in adults bears many similarities with studies of romantic quality. Indeed, some studies measuring friendship quality directly adapt measures of romantic quality like the Marriage Quality index to a friendship context. One of the only scales created specifically for the measurement of adult friendship quality that has seen widespread academic use is the McGill Friendship Questionnaire, published by Mendelson and Aboud in 1999. The scale conceptualizes friendship quality as the extent to which a friend is able to fulfill the following functions:

1. Stimulating companionship (experiencing fun and excitement with a friend)
2. Help (tangible and emotional support provided by a friend)
3. Intimacy (feelings of closeness and trust within the friendship)
4. Reliable Alliance (being able to count on a friend when they are needed)
5. Self-Validation (boosting feelings of self-esteem and self-worth)
6. Emotional Security (comfort provided by a friend in unfavorable situations)

Later work has examined the quality of an individual's network of friends, as opposed to satisfaction with a singular friend. Victor Kaufman at UCLA's Marriage and Close Relationships Lab developed the Friendship Network Satisfaction (FNS) Scale in 2022. The FNS has two subscales of overall Friendship Satisfaction: closeness (feelings of being understood by friends, feeling close to friends, etc.) and socialization (spending free time with friends, doing things with friends, etc.). The scale is used to measure an individual's satisfaction with their network of friends, rather than their satisfaction with any individual friend.

==== Outcomes of Friendship Quality in Adults ====
Friendship quality has shown to be a predictor of psychological well-being, happiness, and life satisfaction. Individuals in high-quality friendships report reduced feelings of loneliness and depression. University students with friendships of high quality have reported better adjustment to campus life and general psychosocial adjustment to adulthood.

Individuals who reported greater satisfaction with their friendship networks also reported feeling more satisfied with life, having higher quality relationships with romantic partners and family members, and greater psychological well-being.

== In family relationships ==
Measurements of relationship quality in family relationships sees a similar range of proposed methods and dimensions as romantic and friendship quality measurements. The number of questionnaires, indexes, and other scales used to assess children and their relationships is vast. Some researchers measure overall family quality, or the felt satisfaction with the family as a whole. Others have attempted to study relationship quality in the context of more specific familial ties, distinguishing between parent-child relationship quality and sibling-sibling relationship quality.

One commonly used measure of assessing overall Family Quality is the Family Assessment Measure (FAM) developed by Skinner, Steinhauer, and Santa-Barbara in 1983. It consists of three general components that are meant to be completed by all members of a family.

1. A General Scale that focuses on the function and health of the family as a system
2. A Dyadic Relationships Scale that examines the relationships between specific pairs of family members (i.e., with parent, with sibling)
3. A Self-Rating scale which evaluates self-ratings of functioning in the family.

As a whole, the quality of family relationships has been found to influence family members' psychological well-being. Those with better family relationships have been found to have reduced psychological distress, stronger resilience, more self-compassion, optimism, self-esteem, and a greater overall satisfaction.

=== Parent–child relationships ===
Notable about the measurement of parent-child relationship quality is that the child and parent will receive different scale questions. This is unlike measures of romantic, friendship, or sibling quality wherein both individuals of the dyad typically answer the same set of questions about their relationship. "Parent" in this sense is only used broadly, and measures of parent-child relationship quality can be used to measure the relationship quality with any primary caregiver.

Though there is no universal agreement on the measurement of parent-child relationship quality, parent-child relationship quality is typically related to the balance of exchanging and receiving support and resulting emotional outcomes.

Examples of psychometric scales used to measure parent-child relationship quality include:

1. Parent-Child Relationship Questionnaire (PCRQ):
  1. This questionnaire measures the relationship quality between a child and their parent via measurement of five domains: warmth, personal relationship, disciplinary action, power assertion, and possessiveness.
2. Parent-Child Relationship Inventory (PCRI):
  1. The PCRI measures the relationship quality between parent and child via six domains: parental support, satisfaction with parent(ing), involvement, communication, limit setting, and autonomy.
3. Parent-Child Interaction Questionnaire—revised (PACHIQ-R):
  1. The PACHIQ-R is split into separate child and parent versions. The Child version is 25 items long while the Parent version is 21 items long. Both versions assess perceptions of conflict resolution and acceptance.

The quality of parent-child relationships has been linked to a number of relational outcomes for both parents and children, though the bulk of the literature has focused on child related outcomes in a clinical diagnostic context. A number of studies have identified that parents with higher relationship quality towards their children experience a range of psychological benefits including happiness, well-being, and satisfaction with life.

Poor parent-child relationship quality has been associated with a host of negative health outcomes for the child, including propensity for engaging with unhealthy eating behaviors, increased chances of developing psychopathological illnesses, and worsened endocrinological processes related to oxytocin and cortisol productions. The effect of low quality parent-child relationships on mental health especially has been seen to continue having deleterious mental health outcomes for the child into adulthood.

Positive parent-child relationship quality for children has been linked with greater functioning in future romantic relationships, academic achievement, and psychological and social well-being in college.

Research by Clarke, Meredith, and Rose (2020) examined how trust, communication quality, and emotional support influence parent–adolescent relationship quality and developmental outcomes. The study found that higher levels of parental warmth and open communication were associated with improved emotional regulation and fewer behavioral problems among adolescents. Adolescents who reported greater trust in their parents also demonstrated higher self-esteem and more effective coping strategies In addition, consistent parental involvement and emotional support were linked to lower levels of stress and reduced risk of psychological difficulties. These findings extend prior research linking parent child relationship quality to psychological and social well-being In contrast, lower levels of trust and limited communication were associated with increased emotional distress and greater conflict within parent–adolescent relationships.

=== Sibling relationships ===
Despite a lack of scholarly consensus on sibling relationship quality, common theoretical components of sibling relationship quality include warmth, conflict, and differential treatment from parents. Warmth in this context refers to the positive elements of the sibling relationship (i.e., intimacy, closeness, companionship). Perceived differences in treatment from parents has also been shown to be influential for sibling relationship quality, such that unequal displays of affection often worsen the relationship.

Examples of psychometric scales used to measure sibling relationship quality include:

1. Sibling Relationship Questionnaire (SRQ):
  1. The SRQ measures sibling relationship quality via dimensions of warmth/closeness, relative power/status, conflict, and rivalry.
2. Sibling Relationship Inventory (SRI)
  1. The Sibling Relationship Inventory measures sibling relationship quality via dimensions of affection, hostility, and rivalry.

Lower levels of relationship quality with siblings has been linked to increased conflict with the sibling, increased likelihood of developing depression, and greater chances of becoming involved with drug use. Sibling relationships of high quality have been associated with greater social competence, fewer problematic behaviors in adolescence, reduced depressive symptoms after stressful life events, and higher levels of psychological well-being.

Relationship quality is closely associated with overall life satisfaction, as supportive family relationships have been shown to increase happiness and reduce feelings of loneliness, with individuals reporting higher quality relationships also xperiencing greater emotional well being. Within this context, sibling relationships play a significant role in social and emotional development through both positive and negative interactions.Supportive sibling relationships promote empathy, communication, and companionship, while conflict can help individuals develop emotion regulation and problem solving skills in a familiar environment. Consistent emotional support and communication within sibling relationships strengthen trust and contribute to stronger family bonds over time. These patterns demonstrate that sibling relationship quality plays an important role in shaping social competence and long erm psychological well-being.
