= Faith Bruyning =

Dutch politician (born 1988)

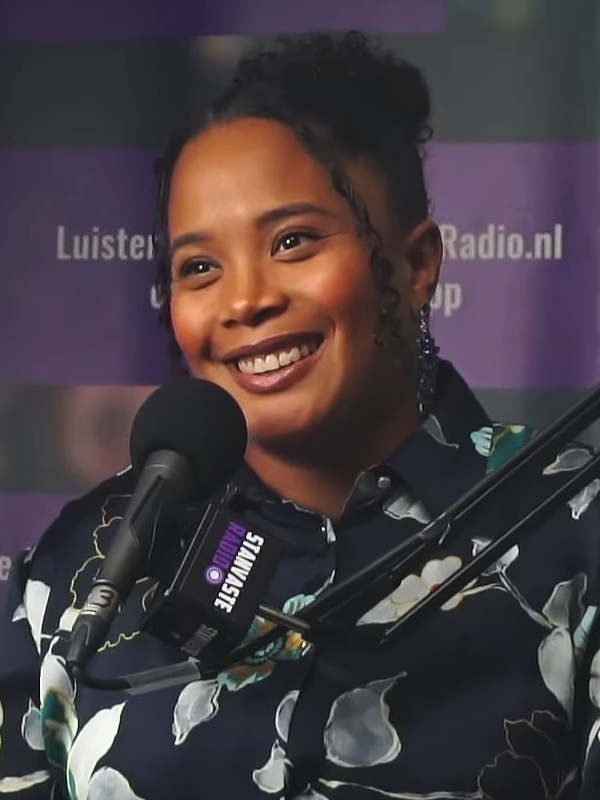
- Bruyning in 2023

Member of the House of Representatives
- In office 6 December 2023 – 11 November 2025

Personal details
- Born: Faith H. Bruyning; 26 January 1988 (age 38) Almere, Netherlands
- Party: New Social Contract
- Children: 2
- Education: Amsterdam University of Applied Sciences (LLB) Vrije Universiteit Amsterdam (LLM)
- Occupation: Jurist; politician

Faith H. Bruyning (born 26 January 1988) is a Dutch jurist and politician of the New Social Contract (NSC) party. She was a member of the House of Representatives between December 2023 and November 2025.

== Early life and career ==
Bruyning was born in Almere on 26 January 1988. At age seven, she was removed from her home by child protective services, and she was subsequently raised by her grandmother. She has told that at a young age she wanted to become judge in a juvenile court to prevent trauma caused by out-of-home placements. She was bullied in school for her apparent lack of parents. Child protective services again intervened in Bruyning's teenage years when she had a run-in with the law, and she was placed in a youth detention center in Den Helder for her safety. She was transferred to another institution in Zeist at age 17 to start her transition back into society, and she completed her VMBO secondary education. Bruyning's father died by suicide in that period.

She returned to her grandmother afterwards, and she gave birth to her first son in 2009. Another son was born four years later. Bruyning studied law at the Amsterdam University of Applied Sciences from 2010 until 2017. As a result of her several side jobs, the Tax and Customs Administration became convinced she had received too much in childcare benefits, and she was forced to pay back significant amounts leading to financial hardship for Bruyning. It was later revealed that tens of thousands of recipients of childcare benefits had been wrongfully accused of being fraudsters. This led to the resignation of the third Rutte cabinet in 2021.

The year after her graduation from the Amsterdam University of Applied Sciences, Bruyning started working for the Municipality of Amsterdam as a fines specialist. She left that job in 2022 and was co-founder of Number 90, a meeting place in Almere for parents impacted by the childcare benefits scandal. She also started advising the Municipality of Almere on the recovery for its victims as part of a newly founded council. Following the completion of a transition study at the Open University, Bruyning obtained her master's degree in law at the Vrije Universiteit Amsterdam in June 2023.

== Politics ==
In the years prior to her election, Bruyning regularly visited debates in the House of Representatives about the childcare benefits scandal, and she met MP Pieter Omtzigt (CDA), who was involved in its uncovering. When Omtzigt founded his own party called New Social Contract (NSC) in the run-up to the November 2023 general election, Bruyning joined it and was placed 18th on its party list for the election. NSC won 20 seats and Bruyning was sworn in as member of the House of Representatives on 6 December 2023. She was the NSC's spokesperson for youth, domestic violence, prisons, and kingdom relations. She was not re-elected in October 2025, as NSC lost all its seats, and her term ended on 11 November.

=== House committees ===
- Petitions committee
- Committee for Kingdom Relations
- Committee for Justice and Security

== Electoral history ==
Electoral history of Faith Bruyning
Year	Body	Party	Pos.	Votes	Result		Ref.
Year	Body	Party	Pos.	Votes	Party seats	Individual	Ref.
2023	House of Representatives	New Social Contract	18	1,529	20	Won	
2025	House of Representatives	New Social Contract	8	895	0	Lost	
