= Behavior Therapy (journal) =

- Discipline: Behavior therapy
- Language: English
- Edited by: Richard T. Liu

Publication details
- History: 1970-present
- Publisher: Elsevier
- Frequency: Quarterly
- Impact factor: 3.228 (2017)

Standard abbreviations
- ISO 4: Behav. Ther.

Indexing
- CODEN: BHVTAK
- ISSN: 0005-7894

Links
- Journal homepage; Online archive

Behavior Therapy is a quarterly peer-reviewed academic journal covering behavior therapy. It was established in 1970 and is published by Elsevier. The editor-in-chief is Richard T. Liu (Harvard Medical School). Previous editors-in-chief have included Jonathan Comer, Alan Kazdin, Thomas Ollendick, and J. Gayle Beck. According to the Journal Citation Reports, the journal has a 2024 impact factor of 3.8.
