= Darby Saxbe =

American clinical psychologist

- Occupation: Professor

Academic background
- Education: Yale University
- Alma mater: University of California, Los Angeles

Academic work
- Discipline: Clinical psychology
- Sub-discipline: Stress in close relationships
- Institutions: University of Southern California

Darby Saxbe is an American clinical psychologist and professor of psychology at the University of Southern California, who is known for her research on the neurobiological underpinnings of the transition to parenthood. She is the author of the book Dad Brain: The New Science of Fatherhood and How it Shapes Men's Lives, published by Flatiron Books.

== Research interests ==
Saxbe researches stress within a close relationship context, with a focus on the transition to parenthood as a nexus of neural, hormonal, behavioral and psychological change. Her studies have found that men's brains change across the transition to parenthood in ways that track with their parenting investment and mental health. She has also studied hormonal linkage within couples and families, finding that partners with more strongly correlated cortisol levels report more relationship distress and that expectant couples may show linked levels of testosterone which in turn predict paternal relationship investment. She has also found that testosterone levels in new fathers are associated with both their own and their partners' postpartum depressive symptoms, and has examined sleep as another mechanism for within-couple transmission of postpartum depression risk. An additional past project of hers focused on using fMRI scanning to study adolescent brain activation in response to stimuli of aggressive family conflict involving both parents.

== Education and awards ==
Saxbe received her BA in English Literature and Psychology from Yale University and her Ph.D. from the University of California, Los Angeles. In 2018, she was awarded an American Psychological Association's Award for Distinguished Scientific Early Career Contributions to Psychology in the field of health psychology. She has also been named an Association for Psychological Science Rising Star, received the Society for Research in Child Development Early Career Award in 2015, the Caryl Rusbult Early Career Award for Relationship Research from the Society for Personality and Social Psychology in 2017, and a Fulbright Program Fellowship to Barcelona, Spain in fall 2019 to study cross-cultural perspectives on the parenting brain.

== Media and consulting ==
Saxbe writes the Substack newsletter, Natal Gazing. Her work and writing have been featured in The Conversation, Slate, Fast Company, NPR, the New York Times, and elsewhere. She has consulted on books including Jancee Dunn's How Not to Hate Your Husband After Kids and Eve Rodsky's Fair Play. She wrote the book, Dad Brain: The New Science of Fatherhood for Flatiron Books, an imprint of Macmillan Books, with a June 2026 publication date.
