= Jonathan Comer =

American psychologist

Jonathan S. Comer
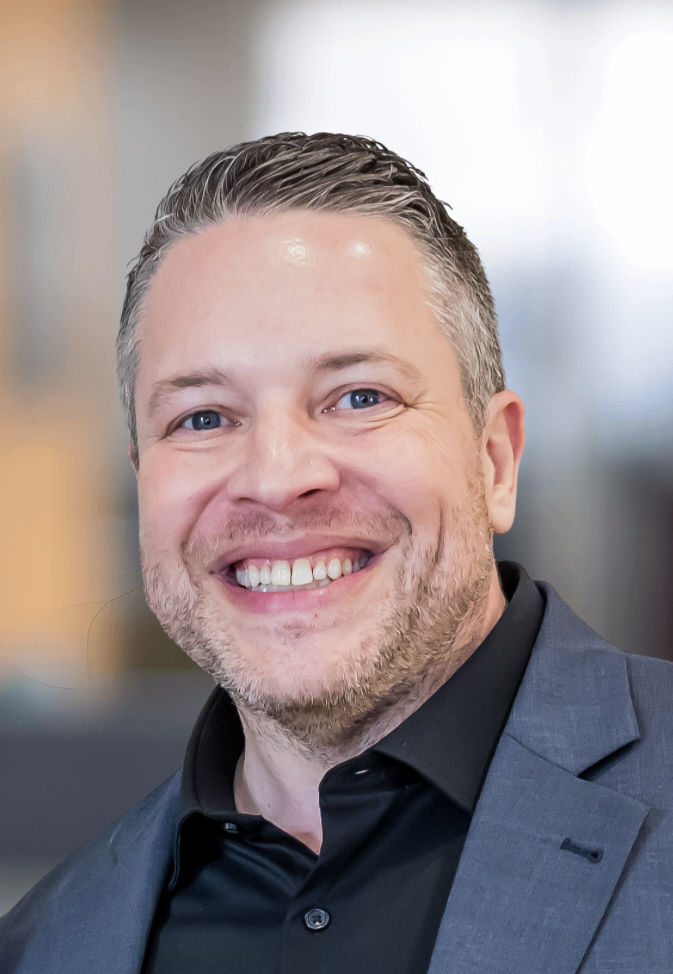
- Born: Princeton, New Jersey
- Citizenship: United States of America
- Known for: research on anxiety disorders, telehealth for mental health challenges, the effects of disasters and terrorism on children and families, disruptive behavior problems, and child trauma.
- Title: Distinguished University Professor and Director of the Mental Health Interventions and Novel Therapeutics (MINT) Program

Academic background
- Education: Temple University; University of Rochester
- Doctoral advisor: Philip C. Kendall

Academic work
- Discipline: Psychology
- Website: FIU Profile

Jonathan S. Comer is an American psychologist and Professor of Psychology at Florida International University. His research focuses on child and adolescent mental health, including anxiety disorders, trauma, and the impact of disasters on youth, as well as the use of technology to expand access to evidence-based care. His work has been featured in national media outlets including NBC News, CBS News, The New York Times, and The Washington Post.

He directs the Mental Health Interventions and Novel Therapeutics (MINT) Program, an interdisciplinary clinical research program focused on improving the accessibility and quality of mental health services. He also serves as director of the Network for Enhancing Wellness in Disaster-Affected Youth (NEW DAY), a program within the National Child Traumatic Stress Network that provides training and consultation to youth-serving professionals in disaster-affected regions. His work has been funded by agencies including the National Institutes of Health, the Substance Abuse and Mental Health Services Administration, the Patient-Centered Outcomes Research Institute, and the National Science Foundation.

Comer is a Fellow of the American Psychological Association. In 2025, he received the Florence Halpern Award for Distinguished Professional Contributions to Clinical Psychology from the American Psychological Association’s Society of Clinical Psychology. That same year, he was promoted to Distinguished University Professor at Florida International University.

Comer received his B.A. from the University of Rochester and his M.A. and Ph.D. in Clinical Psychology from Temple University. He completed his clinical internship at the NYU-Bellevue Clinical Psychology Internship Program and the NYU Child Study Center, and subsequently completed an NIH-funded postdoctoral fellowship in child psychiatry at Columbia University, where he served as Chief Research Fellow in the Division of Child and Adolescent Psychiatry.

== Research ==
Comer's research focuses on child and adolescent mental health, including anxiety disorders, trauma, and the impact of disasters on youth. His work also examines ways to improve the accessibility and delivery of evidence-based mental health care, including through telehealth, digital interventions, and the use of just-in-time adaptive interventions and artificial intelligence.

A major area of Comer's research involves the development and evaluation of technology-assisted mental health services. His work has examined the use of videoconferencing, mobile platforms, and other digital tools to expand access to care, particularly for underserved populations and young children.

Comer has also conducted research on the psychological impact of disasters and mass trauma on children and families. His studies of youth exposed to events—such as the September 11 attacks, the Boston Marathon bombing, Hurricane Irma, and the COVID-19 pandemic—have been widely cited in national media coverage.

His work on children's responses to disasters has also informed broader public discussions of youth mental health following large-scale crises.

In addition to disaster mental health, Comer's research has contributed to understanding early childhood anxiety and depression, including how these conditions manifest in young children. He has also contributed to public discussions about how parents and caregivers can communicate with children about distressing current events.

His work further includes studies of the epidemiology of mental health service use and efforts to improve the quality and reach of mental health care systems. In recent years, his research has expanded to examine biological and neurodevelopmental processes associated with psychopathology and treatment response.

== Books ==
Comer has authored several undergraduate and graduate textbooks and handbooks, including Psychopathology: Science and Practice, 12th edition (Comer & Comer, 2024), "Fundamentals of Psychopathology, 11th edition" (Comer & Comer, 2025), and The Oxford Handbook of Research Strategies for Clinical Psychology (Comer & Kendall, 2013).

== Professional roles ==
Comer is Past President of the Society of Clinical Psychology (Division 12 of the American Psychological Association). He was also an elected Officer in the Society of Clinical Child and Adolescent Psychology where he served on the board of directors. Comer is Editor-in-Chief of Behavior Therapy and previously was Editor-in-Chief of the Clinical Psychologist. He also serves as Chair of the Miami International Child and Adolescent Mental Health (MICAMH) conference, an annual interdisciplinary conference hosted at Florida International University that presents evidence-based practices in child and adolescent mental health.
