= Relationship forming =

Relationship forming focuses on the decision-making process leading to a relationship. It therefore differs from relationship therapy which focuses on improving an existing relationship. Put differently, relationship forming is about "making the right choice", while relationship therapy is about "making the choice work". Discontent at failure to achieve such a relationship is on occasion referred to as TFL (true forced loneliness); although some TFLers may have life satisfaction despite not forming a relationship.

== Summary of differences ==
- Therapy is typically studied and written on by therapists, while relationship forming is studied and written on by intermediaries.
- Therapy has a reactive approach and tries to solve an existing problem, relationship forming has a proactive approach and tries to prevent future problems.
- Therapy focuses on couples that are often in their 30s to 50s, while relationship forming focused on singles who are often younger.

== See also ==
- Interpersonal communication relationship dissolution
- Relationship maintenance
- Socionics
