= Christopher R. Agnew =

American social psychologist

Christopher Agnew
- Born: Christopher Rolfe Agnew
- Education: Georgetown University (BSFS); San Francisco State University (MA); University of North Carolina at Chapel Hill (PhD)
- Scientific career
- Fields: Social psychology, interpersonal relationships
- Workplaces: Purdue University

Christopher Rolfe Agnew is an American social psychologist and professor in the Department of Psychological Sciences at Purdue University. He has affiliated-faculty appointments in Purdue's departments of Communication and Political Science.

== Education ==
Agnew earned a Bachelor of Science in Foreign Service from Georgetown University in 1987, a Master of Arts in social psychology from San Francisco State University in 1990, and a Ph.D. in social psychology from the University of North Carolina at Chapel Hill in 1994.

== Career ==
Before joining Purdue University, Agnew was a statistical consultant at the University of North Carolina at Chapel Hill. He joined Purdue University in 1995 as an assistant professor in the Department of Psychological Sciences. He was promoted to associate professor in 2001 and to professor in 2009. He served as director of graduate studies and as director of the department's social psychology area. From 2009 to 2017, he was head of the Department of Psychological Sciences.

From 2017 to 2022, Agnew served as Purdue's associate vice president for research for regulatory affairs and as institutional official.

== Research ==
Agnew's research is in social psychology and the study of interpersonal relationships, with particular emphasis on commitment and interdependence in close relationships. His work has examined the cognitive, emotional, and behavioral aspects of commitment, including cognitive interdependence, relationship satisfaction, investments, perceived alternatives, and relationship stability.

His research has also addressed the formation, maintenance, and dissolution of romantic relationships. Topics have included relationship readiness, social network influences, social disapproval, relationship advice, power within relationships, attachment, and the role of relationship processes in decisions about sexual health and condom use.

More recently, Agnew has examined interpersonal relationship processes in virtual reality, including the formation of affiliative connections between strangers, avatar appearance, and online relationships. His work has also considered commitment and intimacy in parasocial and digitally mediated relationships.

== Awards and honors ==
Agnew received the Graduate Student Award for Distinguished Achievement from San Francisco State University in 1990 and the Early Career Award from the Relationships Researchers Interest Group of the Society for Personality and Social Psychology in 2003. He was elected a fellow of the Association for Psychological Science in 2006, the American Psychological Association in 2011, and the Society for Personality and Social Psychology.

Agnew was elected president of the International Association for Relationship Research in 2010.

In 2011, the University of North Carolina at Chapel Hill established the Christopher R. Agnew Research Innovation Award in his honor. He received Purdue University's Walk the Talk Award in 2022 and the Career Research Achievement Award from its College of Health and Human Sciences in 2025.
