= Investment model of commitment =

Predictive psychology theory about why people remain in relationships

The investment model of commitment, originally described by Caryl E. Rusbult, is a predictive psychological theory that aims to explain why people remain in relationships. Its tenants are based primarily on those of interdependence theory, created by Harold Kelley and John Thibaut. Interdependence theory is based on both satisfaction and dependence. One's satisfaction within a relationship is determined by the outcomes one sees in a relationship versus their comparison level, or what one expects out of a relationship. Dependence is a measure that compares the outcomes of a relationship with the outcomes possible in another relationship, or an alternative. In the case of interdependence theory, one would theoretically be able to predict whether an interaction or relationship will flourish or end poorly based on whether each person in the relationship is satisfied, and if they each believe that the situation they are currently in is superior to a relationship that they could have with an alternative. However, certain situations in which people remain in relationships cannot fully be explained by this model alone. Examples include relationships in which outside alternatives are likely better, including abusive relationships. For this reason, the investment model was theorized to further predict relationships like these.

== Overview ==
The investment model adds a third factor to interdependence theory, which is investment size. These three factors contribute to a measure of "commitment," which can be used to determine whether or not two people will remain in a relationship with one another. Given that in relationships, there is often an unjustified persistence for people to stay together, it seems as though there must be other things at work besides just satisfaction, and comparison with alternatives.

Given this fact, the investment model describes these three factors, and claims that all of these things add up to a central measure of commitment. If commitment, considering all of these factors is high, then the relationship will remain afloat, even if one of the factors is particularly low. In a similar way, if commitment is very low, even if one of the factors is very high, then the relationship will likely end. Investments within this model are characterized into two subsets, intrinsic and extrinsic. Meanwhile, this theory also predicts mechanisms that people employ in order to stay together, who would without investments likely separate. Much has been researched regarding this topic, and evidence points towards the investment model as an accurate predictor of all types of relationship success.

== Investment types ==
There are two types of investments defined within the investment model. However, according to Rusbult herself, investment sizes can be modeled by the equation: "Investment Size = the sum total of all investments of a resource multiplied by the importance of that resource." The two types of investments that fit into the total investment size are intrinsic and extrinsic investments, which can include both physical, tangible investments, or intangible ones.

=== Intrinsic investments ===
Intrinsic investments are commonly referred to as things that are put directly into the relationship that we are in. Some tangible examples of this can include spending money on a partner, or giving up possessions for a partner. Meanwhile, intangible examples would include putting in effort to the relationship, or spending quality time. Essentially, intrinsic investments are things that one person has that they use in or on the relationship, usually to make the relationship work.

=== Extrinsic investments ===
Extrinsic investments are things that now exist or have been created because of the relationship. Tangible examples of extrinsic investments include the ownership of a house with a partner or becoming parents, while an intangible example would be memories shared with a partner. Thus, extrinsic investments are experiences that have been created or improved as a result of the relationship, which have the potential to cause undue hardship in the event of a breakup or divorce.

== Maintenance mechanisms ==
Rusbult theorizes that relationships that would otherwise separate often tend to stay together due to significant investments made in a relationship. Because of this, Rusbult explains that partners in these relationships often use various coping mechanisms to maintain their relationships through other realms of relationship satisfaction, and comparison with alternatives. Examples of mechanisms commonly used include accommodation, willingness to sacrifice, forgiveness, positive illusions, and ridiculing alternatives.

=== Willingness to sacrifice ===
Willingness to sacrifice is a factor within a relationship that determines how much one partner is willing to give up their interests or hobbies for the sake of a relationship or partner. This sacrifice could be passive or active. Passive sacrifice is when a partner stops doing something, or gives something up, within a relationship. Meanwhile, active sacrifice occurs when a partner starts doing a behavior that they may not want to do, or is not desirable. Many things can affect a partner's willingness to sacrifice, but the primary cause of this behavior is to help maintain a relationship, a direct result of how committed one is to their relationship.

=== Forgiveness ===
Forgiveness occurs when a partner does something wrong in the relationship, and the other partner decides to not hold a grudge against the partner for that. If a partner does something wrong, leading to lower satisfaction levels, satisfaction levels could increase by choosing forgiveness. This could result in an increase of commitment to the partner. Forgiveness has also been found to bolster trust, which can predict factors such as relationship satisfaction and commitment.

=== Positive illusions ===
This method of relationship maintenance typically involves idealizing particular positive traits of one's partner, and minimizing potential negative traits. In this way, one would hold beliefs about a significant other's behavior or personality that are often false, exaggerated, or idealized interpretations of reality. Positive illusions have been linked with higher satisfaction and trust. Satisfaction and trust contribute towards heightened commitment within relationships, and thus, increase relationship stability and maintenance.

=== Ridiculing alternatives ===
This is a method of relationship maintenance in which partners view any potential alternative partners in a way that makes them seem like worse partners. This can involve thinking less of their positive traits, or attributing negative traits as a larger portion of their personality. Both of these activities are involved in the ridicule of alternatives, and can help maintain ongoing relationships.

== Research ==
=== Impett, Beals, and Peplau (2002) ===
In a study performed by Impett, Beals, and Peplau in 2001, had goals of proving that satisfaction, alternatives, and investments could predict the commitment of married couples, as well as proving that commitment then determined relationship outcomes. In order to test this theory, a longitudinal study was performed in which married participants were mailed a questionnaire to fill out asking various questions about the relationship, regarding satisfaction, investments, and quality of alternatives. Of the couples who participated, 34% were asked to take the questionnaire again 18 months later.

After analysis of the data, it was found that levels of satisfaction, quality of alternatives, and investments all fit with Rusbult's predicted model. All of these factors were crucial to building commitment within a relationship. Further, when testing for commitment, it was found that commitment was a strong predictive factor to determine relationship success, over this 18-month period.

=== Rhahgan and Axsom (2006) ===
Another study, performed by Rhahgan and Axsom in 2006, attempted to understand if the investment model would be successful in predicting the commitment shown by women in abusive relationships. The reasoning for the study was that since the satisfaction of an abusive relationship would likely be low, and the quality of alternatives would likely be higher, then investment must be the reason why these people remain in relationships. The participants included were recruited from a battered women's shelter, and were asked to complete a questionnaire regarding relationships they had in the past. Other questions included in the survey asked about various factors of the investment model.

The study's results displayed that satisfaction tended to be low in these relationships, and that quality of alternatives was usually higher than other, nonabusive relationships. However, many women reported feeling as though they would lose something important, in the form of investments, if they were to leave the relationship. This study showed that all the factors contribute to commitment, and then, that commitment is the deciding factor of relationship success, once again showing strengths of the investment model.

=== Le and Agnew (2003) ===
A third study by Le and Agnew in 2003 performed a meta-analysis of many different studies to view whether many different studies that had already occurred could agree on the effectiveness or lack thereof the investment model. Using 52 studies and over 11,000 participants, they found that 2/3 of variance in partners' commitment to relationships could be explained by satisfaction, alternatives, and investment. Moreover, the study found that commitment was the primary predictive measure that could determine long-term relationship success.

This same study also displayed that the investment model continues to describe relationships across cultures and around the world. In both individualistic, as well as collectivist cultures, the investment model is able to predict relationship success using the same factors. Given that many aspects of relationships can be different cross culturally, it shows the predictive power and efficacy of the investment model in predicting human relationships.

== Critiques ==
However, there have also been studies which disagree with the investment model's method of prediction. One study, performed by Susan Sprecher, analyzed data from 197 married couples residing in Madison, Wisconsin. All of the couples were asked to fill out a questionnaire about commitment, satisfaction, quality of alternatives, and investments. It was found that satisfaction and quality of alternatives are much more important for determining total commitment levels than investment size. This disagrees partially with Rusbult's initial model, and supports an interdependence theory way of predicting relationship outcomes, by disregarding the investments.
