= Thomas Ollendick =

American psychologist (born 1945)

Thomas H. Ollendick
- Born: 1945 (age 79–80); Nebraska
- Education: Loras College (B.A., 1967), Purdue University (M.S., 1969; Ph.D., 1971)
- Awards: 2011 Honorary Doctorate in the Social Sciences from the Stockholm University, 2013 Lifetime/Achievement Career Award from the Association for Behavioral and Cognitive Therapies
- Scientific career
- Fields: Child psychology
- Institutions: Virginia Tech, Indiana State University
- Thesis: A study of need for achievement as related to persistence behavior and academic performance (1971)

Thomas Hubert Ollendick (born 1945 in Nebraska) is an American psychologist known for his work in clinical child and adolescent psychology and cognitive behavior therapy with children. From 1999 to the present, he has been a University Distinguished Professor of psychology at Virginia Tech, and the Director of their Child Study Center.

== Education and career ==
Ollendick was educated at Loras College (B.S. 1967) and Purdue University (Ph.D. 1971). Following a post-doctoral fellowship at the Devereux Foundation, Institute for Clinical Training and Research (1971–1972), he began his full-time academic career at Indiana State University, where he became an assistant professor of psychology in 1972 and promoted to associate professor with tenure in 1976. He joined the Virginia Tech faculty as a tenured, associate professor in 1980. In 1984, he was promoted from associate professor to full professor of psychology at Virginia Tech and the Director of Clinical Training, a position which he held until 1996. In that year, he became the director of their Child Study Center. He was named a University Distinguished Professor at Virginia Tech in 1999.

== Research ==
Ollendick is known for his research on phobias and anxiety in children. as well as Cognitive Behavior Therapy He is the author of 400 plus research articles, 100 plus book chapters, and the author or editor of 35 plus books. His books include one of the first books written for the treatment of children and adolescents called Clinical Behavior Therapy with Children in 1981 (Plenum Press) and more recently the Oxford Handbook of Clinical Child and Adolescent Psychology (2018) and Innovations in CBT Treatment for Childhood Anxiety, OCD, and PTSD (2019, Cambridge).

He is Past-President of the Association for the Advancement of Behavior Therapy (1995), the Society of Clinical Psychology (1999), the Society of Clinical Child and Adolescent Psychology (2007), and the Society for the Science of Clinical Psychology (2010). The recipient of several NIMH grant awards, his clinical and research interests range from the study of diverse forms of child psychopathology to the assessment, treatment, and prevention of these child disorders from a social learning/social cognitive theory perspective. He has served as the mentor and dissertation advisor for 45 doctoral students – all since joining Virginia Tech in 1980.

Dr. Ollendick received an Honorary Doctorate from Stockholm University in 2011 and holds Honorary Professor Positions at Roehampton University in London, Griffith University in Brisbane, Australia, and Sydney Institute of Technology in Sydney, Australia. He was awarded the Distinguished Research Contributions to the Field of Clinical Child Psychology in 2007 (APA), the Career/Lifetime Achievement Award from the Association for Behavioral and Cognitive Therapies in 2013, the Lifetime Achievement Award for Scientific Contributions from the Society of Clinical Psychology (APA) in 2017, the Aaron T. Beck Lifetime Career Award from the Academy of Cognitive Therapy in 2019, the Lifetime Career Award from the Spanish AITANA Society for Child and Adolescent Clinical Psychology in 2019, and the Distinguished Scientist Award from the Society for the Science of Clinical Psychology in 2020.

== Editorial activities ==
Ollendick was the editor-in-chief of the Journal of Clinical Child Psychology from 1997 to 2001. Since 1997, he has been a founding co-editor-in-chief of Clinical Child and Family Psychology Review. From 2010 to 2013, he was editor-in-chief of Behavior Therapy.
