= Tamara Afifi =

Communications scholar

Tamara Dawn Afifi is a communications scholar who focuses on topics such as family communication, stress, and communication. She is one of the creators of the Theory of Resilience and Relational Load (TRRL) and is currently a professor in the department of communication at the University of California, Santa Barbara and the editor of Communication Monographs. As of June 2020, Afifi has an h-index of 25.

== Education ==
Afifi received her bachelor's degree from Concordia College in 1990. She earned her master's degree from North Dakota State University in 1996 and her Ph.D. from the University of Nebraska–Lincoln in 1999.

== Career ==
Afifi is currently a professor at the University of California, Santa Barbara, where she has taught through the years 2011 to 2013 and 2016 to present. From 2013 to 2016 she taught at the University of Iowa. Before that, she was an associate professor at the University of California, Santa Barbara, and Penn State University. She was also an assistant professor at Penn State University and Luther College.

== Theory of Resilience and Relational Load ==
In 2017, Afifi explained her research on her communications Theory of Resilience and Relational Load in the book Engaging Theories in Family Communication: Multiple Perspectives. The Theory of Resilience and Relational Load is the theory to understand how families and relationships deal with stride and resilience. The basic idea of TRRL (Theory of Resilience and Relational Load) is that when couples or relationships have a more positive outlook on the stress, they appraise the other with positivity which lets the relationship grow together to create a healthier relationship mentally. However, when a relationship or family handles the stress poorly, it can cause a distance between parties by allowing the people involved to diminish the others. If this occurs for a long period of time, it creates a relational reload.

In 2018, Afifi continued to study the Theory of Resilience and Relational Load with families who had a child that had type 1 diabetes. They wanted to see if the stress in a relationship affects type 1 diabetes stress. They started by having the couples talk about a stressful situation and then had them do a two-week intervention to increase the amount of time the couple had to put in their relationship. They found out that the children and the wife's stress level with type 1 diabetes correlated together and the husband's did not. They also found out that by putting the amount of time into the relationship caused less stress and they had less stress about the conversation. However, for the children, they found that it reduced stress in general, not specifically for type 1 diabetes.

== Awards ==
- Franklin H. Knower Article Award, from the National Communication Association (2018, with Anne F. Merrill and Sharde Davis)
- Franklin H. Knower Article Award, from the National Communication Association (2019, with Sharde Davis)
- Franklin H. Knower Article Award, from the National Communication Association (2012, with Douglas Granger, Amanda Denes, Andrea Joseph, and Desiree Aldeis)
- Top Four Paper Awards, from the National Communication Association (2018, with Paul Schrodt)

== Bibliography ==
- Uncertainty, Information Management, and Disclosure Decisions: Theories and Applications (2009, editor with Walid A. Afifi)
