= Caryl Rusbult =

American academic

Caryl E. Rusbult was a professor and chair of the Department of Social and Organizational Psychology at the Vrije Universiteit in Amsterdam, Netherlands. She died from uterine cancer on 27 January 2010. Rusbult received her B.A. in Sociology from UCLA (1974) and Ph.D. in Psychology from the University of North Carolina at Chapel Hill (1978). During her time as a professor at Chapel Hill (1986–2004) she made seminal contributions to theoretical social psychology including the investment model of commitment processes, a theoretical model of accommodation processes, and the Michelangelo effect.

Rusbult’s Investment Model of Commitment Processes is one of the most well-known and influential theoretical frameworks in the area of close relationships. This model explains how committed partners maintain and promote their relationships by transforming personal motives to take into account the necessity of coordinating and getting along with partners.

Rusbult served as an associate editor for the Journal of Personality and Social Psychology (1990 to 1994) and the Encyclopedia of Psychology (1996 to 2000), and was elected to the boards of several national and international organizations (e.g., Society of Experimental Social Psychologists, International Society for the Study of Personal Relationships).

The Caryl E. Rusbult Young Investigator Award has been created in her memory.

== Honors and awards ==
- Distinguished Alumni Award, University of North Carolina at Chapel Hill (2009)
- Distinguished Career Award, International Association for Relationships Research (2008): “in recognition of a full career of eminent, notable contributions to research in, theories of, or the practice of relationships science”
- William Friday Professor, University of North Carolina at Chapel Hill (2000–2005)
- Mentoring Award, International Association for Relationship Research (2002): “in recognition of outstanding achievement in mentoring new scholars”
- J. Ross MacDonald Professorship, University of North Carolina at Chapel Hill (1997–2002)
- New Contribution Award, International Society for the Study of Personal Relationships (1991–1992): “to recognize new work that makes a significant and original contribution to the study of personal relationships, work that provides important new insights and has had, or holds promise of having, a substantial impact on the scholarly activity of others in the field”
- Reuben Hill Award, National Council on Family Relations (1991): “to recognize that publication which best combines research and theory about a family issue”
- Outstanding Faculty Award, University of Kentucky Chapter of the Psi Chi (1983): Excellence in teaching
