= Clinical Child and Family Psychology Review =

- Discipline: Clinical psychology, child psychology, family psychology
- Language: English
- Edited by: Ronald J. Prinz, Thomas Ollendick

Publication details
- History: 1998–present
- Publisher: Springer Science+Business Media
- Frequency: Quarterly
- Impact factor: 5.574 (2020)

Standard abbreviations
- ISO 4: Clin. Child Fam. Psychol. Rev.

Indexing
- CODEN: CCFPFB
- ISSN: 1096-4037 (print); 1573-2827 (web)
- LCCN: 98642383
- OCLC no.: 233137220

Links
- Journal homepage; Online archive

Clinical Child and Family Psychology Review is a quarterly peer-reviewed scientific journal which publishes review articles in the fields of clinical, child, and family psychology. It was established in 1998 and is published by Springer Science+Business Media. The editors-in-chief are Ronald J. Prinz (University of South Carolina) and Thomas Ollendick (Virginia Polytechnic Institute and State University). According to the Journal Citation Reports, the journal has a 2020 impact factor of 5.574.
