= Attachment and health =

Relationship between attachment theory and personal health

Attachment and health is a psychological model which considers how the attachment theory pertains to people's preferences and expectations for the proximity of others when faced with stress, threat, danger or pain. In 1982, American psychiatrist Lawrence Kolb noticed that patients with chronic pain displayed behaviours with their healthcare providers akin to what children might display with an attachment figure, thus marking one of the first applications of the attachment theory to physical health. Development of the adult attachment theory and adult attachment measures in the 1990s provided researchers with the means to apply the attachment theory to health in a more systematic way. Since that time, it has been used to understand variations in stress response, health outcomes and health behaviour. Ultimately, the application of the attachment theory to health care may enable health care practitioners to provide more personalized medicine by creating a deeper understanding of patient distress and allowing clinicians to better meet their needs and expectations.

== History of attachment theory ==
=== Infant attachment ===
John Bowlby and Mary Ainsworth developed the attachment theory in the 1960s while investigating the effects of maternal separation on infant development. The development of the Strange Situation task in 1965 by Ainsworth and Wittig allowed researchers to systematically investigate the attachment system operating between children and their parents. The Strange Situation involves separating infant-parent dyads and observing infant behaviours upon reunion. Infant behaviour tended to follow patterns, leading to the development of three attachment categories: Secure, Anxious-Avoidant, and Anxious-Resistant. In 1990, Ainsworth added a new category, championed by Mary Main, called Disorganized/Disoriented attachment, characterized by its less reliable pattern of behaviour.

Bowlby believed attachment to be a primary biological drive to achieve proximity with a caregiver that transforms across child development to also encompass a psychological drive to find security by achieving a preferred interpersonal distance with an important caregiver he called an attachment figure. Insecure attachment patterns develop when caregivers are experienced as inconsistent or unpredictable, which necessitates the development of different strategies to achieve a sense of comfort and safety within an interpersonal setting. Furthermore, he posited that attachment figures function as a secure base that facilitate environmental exploration and that attachment behaviours are triggered by perceived stress, danger or pain, and are thus state dependent.

=== Adult attachment ===
In the late 1980s Cindy Hazan and Phillip Shaver applied the attachment theory to adult romantic relationships based on observations of the interactions between adult romantic partners. They noticed that romantic partners often prefer to be physically close, become anxious when they are separated and that stressful situations can be buffered by the presence of a romantic partner. Three main methods of measuring adult attachment have been developed, with slightly different purposes and variable amounts of concordance between them. Some aim to categorize attachment style while others rate degrees of attachment anxiety and avoidance.

== Attachment styles ==
Attachment styles refer to characteristic patterns of thought concerning the ability of self and others to help an individual achieve security. Longitudinal studies have suggested attachment is fairly stable from childhood to adulthood. When shifts do occur, it is usually with good reason; it shifts away from secure attachment due to increased hardship and shifts towards secure related to finding partners in adulthood or finding symbolic attachments (God, places, pets, etc.).

=== Secure ===
Securely attached people generally have positive views about themselves and about others. They tend to agree with statements "It is relatively easy for me to become emotionally close to others.", "I am comfortable depending on others and having others depend on me.", and "I don't worry about being alone or others not accepting me."

=== Insecure ===
- Anxious-preoccupied people tend to view themselves less positively than they view others. They are more likely to become highly anxious when they are away from their attachment partners and are at risk of becoming, or seeming, dependent. They tend to agree with statements such as "I want to be completely emotionally intimate with others, but I often find that others are reluctant to get as close as I would like", and "I am uncomfortable being without close relationships, but I sometimes worry that others don't value me as much as I value them."
- Avoidant-dismissive people tend to have a positive view of themselves and a less positive view of others. They often highly value independence and become uncomfortable in, or resist, situations where they become dependent on others. They tend to agree with statements such as "I am comfortable without close emotional relationships", "It is very important to me to feel independent and self-sufficient", and "I prefer not to depend on others or have others depend on me." This is considered to be roughly equivalent to the anxious-avoidant style in children.
- Fearful-avoidant people tend to have conflicted, and often negative, views of themselves and of others. They often desire to have emotional relationships but feel uncomfortable when others get too close. They tend to agree with statements such as "I am somewhat uncomfortable getting close to others. I want emotionally close relationships, but I find it difficult to trust others completely, or to depend on them. I sometimes worry that I will be hurt if I allow myself to become too close to others." People with loss or trauma in childhood are at greater risk of developing this style of attachment.

=== Insecure attachment styles in healthcare settings ===
- Anxious-preoccupied people with anxious-preoccupied attachment tend to be hypervigilant to signs of danger and worry or catastrophize about symptoms. In health care appointments, their narrative is full of intense negative emotion but is relatively sparse in the specific detail desired by health care providers. This presentation can readily be perceived as "needy" or "dramatic". If the healthcare provider pulls away in response it may reinforce the patient's need to articulate their distress, creating a cycle of distress-withdrawal-distress.
- Avoidant-dismissive people with avoidant dismissive attachment emphasize their independence and minimizing expressing distress. They may delay seeking healthcare (see healthcare utilization), minimize reporting symptoms and disclose limited personal information.
- Fearful-disorganized people with fearful attachment often avoid routine healthcare, but present in a crisis with volatile, intense, negative emotions. Due to their degree of distress, they can present a disorganized narrative that is difficult for providers to follow and interpret diagnostically.

== Working model ==
Working models are representatives of the cognitive schema, or psychological structure (often unconscious), which underlie the different attachment classifications. Working models develop in children over time based on their experiences with their attachment figures. The cognitive schema for attachment consists of views of the efficacy of self and other to create security in times of distress.

=== Bartholomew and Horowitz model ===
Bartholomew and Horowitz proposed and verified a working model based on two dimensions; the view of the self (self-esteem) and the view of others (sociability)

- Secure: Positive view of self, Positive view of other
- Dismissive: Positive view of self, Negative view of other
- Preoccupied: Negative view of self, Positive view of other
- Fearful: Negative view of self, Negative view of other

=== Prototype-insecurity classification model ===
In 2012 Maunder and Hunter combined the internal working model with the attitudes, behaviours and emotional expression of the different styles to create a prototype based classification that included severity of insecurity. This model was designed to be clinically useful, allowing healthcare providers to identify and predict the behaviours of patients whose attachment systems were activated by pain and illness.

They distinguish the different attachment styles by; 1) attachment anxiety, the discomfort someone feels when separated, 2) attachment avoidance, which is discomfort associated with closeness and 3) severity of insecurity

- Secure: Low anxiety, low avoidance, low severity of insecurity
- Dismissive: Low anxiety, high avoidance, moderate insecurity
- Preoccupied: High anxiety, low avoidance, moderate insecurity
- Fearful: High anxiety, high avoidance, high insecurity
- Disorganized: High anxiety, high avoidance, high insecurity. The difference between disorganized and fearful is that people with disorganized attachment do not use a consistent strategy to find security.

== Attachment and health outcomes ==
Attachment and health interact on multiple levels. Attachment is a biologically based system tied to our response to distress and attachment styles appear to confer differences in stress physiology. Illness and pain themselves act as an "activating signal" for attachment systems, and health care providers act as attachment figures in their role addressing illness and pain. Accordingly, attachment styles influence patient perception of illness, health care utilization, medication compliance and treatment response.

=== Physical health ===
While strong social support has been linked to greater resilience to stress and lower medical morbidity and mortality, the mechanism behind this association is poorly understood. In the late 1990s, Paul Ciechanowski investigated the role of attachment styles in patients managing diabetes, finding that individuals with an avoidant-dismissive style were less likely to be compliant with treatment recommendations and had less well-controlled disease as measured by glycated hemoglobin. Larger scale evidence comes from a large American survey of self-reported attachment styles and physical illness conducted by McWilliams and Bailey. They found that those with insecure attachment reported more physical illness than securely attached individuals. Specifically, they found preoccupied individuals reported more heart disease, and dismissive individuals more pain conditions. A prospective study followed children until the age of 32 and found a similar pattern of results. They found that people with anxious-resistant (dismissive) styles of attachment reported vague, non-specific symptoms more often, and those with anxious-preoccupied classification had a higher rate of inflammation-based illnesses. This prospective study was particularly important because of the difficulty assigning causation in the often observed relationship between chronic pain and insecure attachment. Further support is derived from experimental pain studies that have demonstrated numerous risk factors for the development of a chronic pain disorder associated with insecure adult attachment including lower perceived control of pain, higher pain catastrophizing and higher perceived pain intensity.

=== Mental health ===
Attachment theory can be conceptualized as a theory of emotional regulation. Bowlby predicted that insecure attachment would be a risk factor for mental health difficulties based on ineffective, or overly rigid, strategies for reducing distress and maintaining psychological resilience. There is a substantial body of literature that supports an association between adult insecure attachment and a wide variety of mental health disorders including depression, anxiety, eating, psychotic and personality disorders. Prospective evidence (research starting with infant attachment and following up over time) is mostly limited to studies following infants into childhood or adolescence as opposed to adulthood, but does demonstrate that insecure attachment is a general risk factor for both internalizing and externalizing symptomatology. Of the handful of studies that have followed infants to adulthood, the only two clear relationships that exist are between (1) disorganized attachment and dissociative symptoms and (2) resistant attachment and anxiety disorders in late adolescence.

Causal relationships between insecure attachment and mental illness may be complex. Some risk factors for insecure attachment such as loss of parental figure, and sexual or physical abuse, are also risk factors for mental health disorders. Self-report measures of attachment may be biased by mental health conditions. For example, clinical depression is often associated with negative thoughts about the self, and this cognitive bias may influence the self-report in attachment questionnaires. There may be interpersonal consequences from untreated mental health conditions. Pre-existing psychological problems can increase the likelihood of secure attachment changing to insecure attachment over time.

== Mechanisms by which attachment influences health ==
Maunder and Hunter outlined three ways in which insecure attachment can serve as a risk factor for health problems:

1) It may increase one's susceptibility to stress by changing stress physiology

2) It may be related to potentially harmful behaviours undertaken to regulate affect, and

3) It may change the way people interact with the healthcare system

=== Attachment and stress ===
The stress response in humans is largely governed by the hypothalamic-pituitary-adrenal axis (HPA) and sympathetic nervous system. The HPA axis has garnered particular attention from attachment researchers because it is known to be activated by social stressors. The normal response for this system is to release stress hormones, particularly cortisol, for a brief duration and then shut itself off due to negative feedback, resulting in a short, strong release of cortisol. The HPA axis also follows a circadian rhythm, with highest release within about 30 minutes to 1 hour upon awakening, called the cortisol response to awakening (CRA), and a slow taper throughout the day. Researchers have looked at both cortisol response to stress (CRS) and CRA to determine if attachment anxiety and avoidance underlie individual differences in HPA activity.

Findings in the field have inconsistent. The evidence suggests that (a) individuals with high attachment anxiety perceive a higher degree of distress when faced with a stressor and have higher baseline anxiety compared to those low in attachment anxiety, (b) most studies suggest higher cortisol reactivity to stress in anxiously attached individuals, while two studies did not support this trend(c) avoidant-dismissive attachment has been less consistent, with some studies showing an increase in cortisol produced in response to a stressor, and others not finding any differences in comparison to securely attached individuals(d) fearful attachment is associated with lower cortisol both upon awakening and in response to a stressor although one study in pregnant women found less diurnal variation in those fearfully versus securely attached, leading to a higher bedtime cortisol level in the fearful group. The finding that those with fearful attachment would show small cortisol reactivity in response to a stressor may seem counterintuitive but is in line with the predictions of stress researcher Bruce McEwen, who hypothesized that frequent early stressors in life would cause an initial hyper-reactivity in the HPA axis that would over time become pathologically sluggish as the individual ages, leading to greater overall cortisol release and less adaptive responsivity.

Another related biological system that regulates stress response is the autonomic nervous system. In general, the sympathetic system is activated during times of stress and the parasympathetic system acts to decrease physical readiness for stress. These systems are sometimes called the "fight-or-flight" and "rest-or-digest" systems, respectively, and operate in a balance, as opposed to being totally on or off. Researchers can approximate the relative balance by looking at skin conductance, blood pressure and heart rate. Studies of this kind provided hard evidence that avoidant infants were truly distressed during the strange situation task despite their minimally distressed appearance as they showed elevations in heart rate when caregivers were away and took longer to return to baseline when the caregiver returned in comparison to securely attached infants. Studies of skin conductance and heart rate in adults have shown that those with avoidant attachment and anxious attachment will show markers of increased distress during attachment and non-attachment stressors compared to those securely attached.

=== Health behaviours ===
According to the attachment theory, people with insecure attachments have less effective strategies for dealing with negative emotions compared to people with secure attachments. One way which insecurely-attached individuals may try to regulate their distress is by using strategies or behaviours that are attractive for their short term relief, but may have deleterious risks over years like eating, drug use or risky sex. In a survey of 356 primary care patients in Toronto, rates of smoking, harmful drinking, and obesity, were all found to be highest in those with the most severe anxious and avoidant attachment. Both attachment anxiety and attachment avoidance have been linked in separate studies to increasing the risk of eating disorders and substance use in adolescents.

=== Eating ===
A review of attachment and eating disorder literature in 2010 showed rates of insecure attachment to be approximately 70% in eating disorder populations in contrast to the 30-40% prevalence in the normal population. These rates are similar to those found in other mental health populations. The review noted small trends for anxious attachment to be more highly associated with binge-purging symptomatology and avoidant attachment to be more highly associated with restrictive. The relationship between high attachment anxiety and disinhibited eating, or binge eating, has also been found in non-clinical and pre-bariatric surgery populations. The disordered eating in insecure attachment does seem to have implications for overall health as well, with one study demonstrating a relationship with higher body mass index and another demonstrating a higher risk for metabolic syndrome at midlife.

=== Drug use ===
Recreational substances provide a powerful external means of regulating affect. Insecure attachment is considered to be one of the chief psychological constructs associated with increased risk for drug use. A small study in Germany found that drug users were less likely to be secure than non-drug users and that heroin users in particular had a markedly high rate of fearful attachment. Researchers believed that these findings were in keeping with the "self-medication" hypothesis of drug use and that heroine, as opposed to other drugs of abuse, may target attachment distress more readily by acting more directly on the opioid system. Jaak Panksepp hypothesized in the 1980s that endogenous opioids are responsible for the warm, affiliative, interpersonal feelings that come with social connection, and this has been supported by recent evidence showing that naloxone administration, an opioid blocker, results in a decreased feeling of social connection in healthy individuals. Recent work also demonstrates that attachment dimensions have bearing on natural opioid signaling, with brain scans showing that those high in attachment avoidance have decreased opioid receptor availability. In clinical samples insecure attachment is related to higher opioid use in chronic pain patients and higher analgesic consumption during labor. In a study of young adult females, drug use was one of several risky behaviours that occurred more frequently in those with insecure attachment along with unsafe driving and sexual practices.

=== Sex ===
Risky sexual behaviour is defined as sexual contact with an increased risk of either unwanted pregnancy or sexually transmitted infection. In a study aimed at evaluating the evidence supporting six major risky sex theories, Leslie Simons and her colleagues found that only the social support and attachment theory had strong empirical support. In the attachment theory model, risk is enhanced in insecurely attached individuals due to negative working models of relationships, reduced closeness in intimate relationships and through decreased self-control. In terms of conscious motivations for sex, attachment anxiety is related to many attachment-related motivations including using sex for desire for emotional closeness, reassurance, self-esteem enhancement, stress reduction, the experience and exertion of power, elicitation of caregiving from a partner, protection from a partner's anger or bad moods. Those high in attachment avoidance report using sex for power or partner manipulation and endorse a desire to use sex as a way of avoiding emotional closeness. Accordingly, there is evidence that attachment avoidance is associated with positive attitudes towards casual sex, a higher number of casual sex partners, and an interest in emotionless sex and one-night stands.

=== Treatment adherence ===
Attachment insecurity also plays an important role in how people follow the advice of the healthcare community. Attachment avoidance has consistently been linked to poorer treatment adherence and more recently to no shows in scheduled follow up appointments. Attachment avoidance has also been linked to lower rates of cervical cancer screening in both American and Iranian populations.

=== Healthcare utilization ===
The attachment theory predicts that people high in attachment avoidance and people high in attachment anxiety would display different utilization of health care resources based on their prototypical behavioural responses when stressed. The theory predicts that people high in attachment avoidance, when faced with an illness, are likely to minimize their symptoms, and wait longer to see a health care provider, since they view their own distress as a sign of unacceptable vulnerability and also because their internal working model dictates that other people are not useful in helping them manage distress. For those high in attachment anxiety, they would have higher distress when faced with an illness, less perceived ability to manage it on their own, and thus visit health care services more frequently to try to attain security. For those with high anxiety and high avoidance, or fearful attachment, they would be predicted to present less frequently than those with secure attachment, but show up in a crisis when they do, which may interfere with optimal care. Research findings have generally been supportive of these predictions. One of the earliest studies in the field found correlations between preoccupied attachment and increased symptom reporting and an inverse relationship between avoidant attachment and visits to health professionals. High attachment anxiety has been associated with increased symptom reporting and visits to healthcare providers, and high attachment avoidance associated with less visits and decreased treatment compliance
