= Relationship maintenance =

Behaviours used to maintain a relationship

Relationship maintenance refers to behaviours and strategies that partners use to maintain, strengthen, or improve an interpersonal relationship. It encompasses both routine interactions and deliberate efforts to preserve the relationship and its quality, foster emotional closeness, manage conflict, and support long-term stability. The concept has been examined most extensively in romantic and long-term intimate relationships, although a smaller body of work applies the concept to friendships, family relationships, and other interpersonal contexts, such as involuntary relationships in which individuals must maintain an unwanted connection.

Common behaviours that partners use to sustain, strengthen, or improve romantic and long-term intimate relationships fall into the following categories:

- Routine maintenance behaviours include everyday interactions that positively contribute to relational stability, such as affectionate communication, positive tone, and shared activities
- Strategic maintenance behaviors involve more deliberate or planned efforts, such as intentional conversations, conflict resolution attempts, or scheduled time together
- Communication-based strategies, particularly openness, assurances, and constructive conflict management, have been shown to support relationship satisfaction and commitment
- Behavioral investments, such as cooperation on shared tasks, responsiveness to partner needs, and expressions of long-term commitment
- Emotional and intimate maintenance behaviours, such as expressions of affection, emotional support and sexual or physical intimacy
- Digital maintenance, such as texting, video communication, and online transparency, has become increasingly relevant, particularly in long-distance relationships

First, in order to keep a relationship in existence (for example, adult friends that contact each other infrequently, but adequately to maintain the friendship), means the relationship continues without termination. Second, in order to keep a relationship in a specified state or condition, human communication professors Kathryn Dindia and Daniel Canary "refers to sustaining the present level of certain dimensions or qualities thought to be important in relationship development." There are three elements of a stable relationship: the participants reach minimal agreement about the relationship, relationships can stabilize at different levels of intimacy, and relationship still has considerable change occurring in it.

Canary and Stafford described five communication strategies: positivity, openness, assurances, social networks, and sharing tasks. Each of these qualities equates to spending time together, and interacting either physically or emotionally. Positivity refers to having a positive attitude, even when not necessarily feeling like doing so. This often means not participating in condemnation and negativity. Canary and Stafford mentions openness in a way that encourages discussion in a relationship that is filled with direction and goals. Social networks include having friends and family to help balance out the relationship. Subsequent research has found that maintenance strategies strongly predict important relational characteristics, such as commitment, relational satisfaction, stability, liking, and loving others.

== Social maintenance behaviors ==
When maintaining a relationship, any behavior that is positive and promotes deepening trust and closeness between people is a prosocial maintenance behavior. The more prosocial behavior is evident in a relationship, the more likely for strong bonds to be formed, and the relationship to prosper and continue. Low levels of prosocial maintenance behavior give less reinforcement in the relationship, and thus more a weak foundation often leads to the relationships deterioration, or at least non-progression.

Prosocial maintenance behavior does not value one source of positivity more than the other, although the individual might. Verbalizing fondness through positive speech might be what one partner craves in a relationship, while another might find more affection in a willingness to help with household chores. This type of task sharing is also a part of what is known as routine maintenance, and a relatively equal effort by each party is a prosocial function that greatly adds to relationship satisfaction.

Friends who have romantic intentions are more likely to use prosocial maintenance behavior. Friends that want to move to romantic relationships use more maintenance behaviors, as increases in maintenance behavior mark a change from friendship to romance.

As a contrast to prosocial behavior that is used to strengthen bonds and reinforce a relationship, anti-social maintenance behavior is another strategic behavior pattern that can be used to maintain a current relationship. Its use of continuing a relationship at its current level, would be to decline invitations to opportunities to create new levels of a relationship. Declining these opportunities exemplifies antisocial behavior, which is generally deliberate in its implementation.

== Types of relationships ==
=== Mentor and student ===
Daniel J. A. Rhind and Sophia Jowett of Brunel University conducted a study on relationship maintenance strategies in coach-athlete relationships. They discovered the COMPASS Model which exposed seven main groupings: conflict management, openness, motivation, positivity, advice, support, and social networks. The COMPASS model was developed based on this analysis and was offered as a theoretical framework for understanding how coaches and athletes might maintain the quality of their relationships.

=== Friends ===
A recent study on Italians living as couples has shown that friendship relationships, beyond those within an individual's family, are an important source of support. Data from Aspects of Daily Life, the Italian National Statistical Institute's 2012 multipurpose survey, was used to analyze the relation between friendship ties and life satisfaction. Results show that friendship, in terms of intensity (measured by the frequency with which individuals see their friends) and quality (measured by the satisfaction with friendship relationships), is positively associated to life satisfaction. In the first study of its kind, a University of Kansas professor defined the amount of time necessary to make a friend as well as how long it typically takes to move through the deepening stages of friendship. In a new report published in the Journal of Social and Personal Relationships, Associate Professor of Communication Studies Jeffrey Hall found that it takes roughly 50 hours of time together to move from mere acquaintance to casual friend, 90 hours to go from that stage to simple "friend" status and more than 200 hours before someone can be considered a close friend. Just as time and energy is put into creating a friendship, so is nurturing and maintaining that friendship. Maintaining a friendship can take several forms, such as access to useful information, company (e.g., personal and intimate relationships, time spent talking together, and shared amusement time or meals), and emotional (e.g., advice about a serious personal or family matter) and instrumental (e.g., economic aid, administrative procedures, house-keeping) support.

=== Romantic ===
Romantic relationships have an extra element that is not found in friendship relationships. In romantic relationships, there is the intimacy element that is added. This is physical intimacy and a deeper emotional intimacy than a friendship would have. There are four relationship stages when it comes to romantic relationships: casually dating, seriously dating, engaged, married.

It was reported that married and engaged couples used more assurances and task sharing than did dating couples. However, engaged and seriously dating couples reported that they used openness and positivity more than did married couples. Married couples reported the most social networking. Daters tended to be more social with one another. For example, they called and sent each other notes and cards more than the married couples did.

Partners tend to disclose more information early on in their relationship stages. Then they get to know one another better.

In the marriage stage of relationships, couples tend to have a curvilinear pattern. They use maintenance behavior early on in the relationship and then also in the later years of their marriage. Partners tend to be very excited about the new marriage and work at the relationship maintenance. As the years progress they may shift focus to family or careers, but then later on when their children have grown and they are settled in their careers the focus may come back to the relationship maintenance since the couple have fewer distractions.

==== Romantic intent ====
There are four types of cross-sex friendships that are different in terms of romantic intent. Strictly platonic groups have both sides saying they do not want anything romantic out of the relationship. Those in mutual romance groups both want the friendship to become romantic. Individuals in a desires-romance group indicates that they wanted the friendship to become romantic, but the partner indicate they want to stay friends. Last, the rejects-romance group said that they would like the friendship to stay platonic, but the other person wanted it to become romantic.

Groups that wish to keep the relationship platonic or with only one person interested in romance utilize less relationship maintenance. These groups tend to talk about outside relationships, and there is an activity done together and less flirtations used.

=== Long-distance relationships ===
This type of relationship can be one of the most challenging relationships to maintain. One of the main challenges in maintaining a long-distance relationship is the lack of face-to-face contact and communication. Face-to-face communication is thought to be the adhesive that holds a romantic relationship together. When couples are able to have face-to-face communication, they are able to do things together and interact with each other in a physical manner.

People in long-distance relationships typically use fewer maintenance behaviors, such as openness, assurances, and joint activities, than people who are in a geographically close relationship.

Individuals in long-distance relationships are usually on their best behavior when they are able to be together in person. Compared to those in geographically close relationships, people in long-distance relationships tend to engage in fewer joint activities and less task sharing and social networking.

Compared to those in proximal relationships, partners in long-distance relationships often perceive that their communication with one another is more restricted but of higher quality. It may be the quality of the communication rather than the quantity that is most important in keeping a lasting long-distance relationship working.

== Modality ==
Modes of communication vary from spoken to written, verbal to nonverbal, and face-to-face to computer-mediated. Depending on the mode of communication, the same message can be interpreted in a different way. Therefore, different types of relationships can be maintained through different types of communication.

Face-to-face communication affords the greatest opportunity for precise communication because immediate feedback from the receiver can tell whether the message has been understood accurately. Technology today provides limited face-to-face communication to everyone, even those separated by long distance. Businesses have used video conferencing for many years but programs like Skype now allow a personal face-to-face conversation with anyone in the world. With the technological advancements that have taken place over the past decade, communication has also evolved from handwritten letters to emails and text messaging and significantly shortened response times.

Romantic and close personal relationships use more openness and assurance maintenance behaviors and these are easier to communicate in person. But even these close connections are relying on more computer mediated communication today. Texting can have many uses, from coordinating task sharing to simply letting someone know they are being thought of. People may use Facebook to plan activities with others, announce new relationships, and provide support and encouragement to those in need. Even the birthday card has migrated online. Although technology cannot replace face-to-face communication in these cases, it can supplement and reinforce the importance of the relationship.

Casual connections do not need the same amount of attention as close friendships and romantic relationships. Although there may be some face-to-face communication or telephone calls, social media such as Facebook is enough to maintain an acquaintanceship. Here they can post photos and comments to maintain contact and keep up on each other's lives. If someone is having a bad day, they can provide the necessary support and positivity needed to maintain the relationship.

Some relationships start and stay online. Individuals may meet through a message board or on Facebook while living hundreds of miles away. These virtual relationships require the least amount of maintenance. People in a virtual-only relationship may be highly committed to each other and display just as much maintenance behavior as those in close proximity.

A drawback to using only computer mediated communication is idealization which occurs when a person in a relationship describes the relationship and partner in an unrealistically positive manner. Idealization often will reflect unreal expectations. Mediated communication allows people to control every aspect of the message and they can present an image of themselves that is not real. Facebook relationship maintenance follows implicit rules for interaction. People expect others to present themselves on Facebook in a positive manner and even to limit a post of anything that could hurt their own image or that of a friend. Even if those in a virtual or long-distance relationship do arrange to meet in person, it is usually set up well in advance and allows time to prepare for control of the encounter to reinforce the online image rather than the reality of their life.

Despite its drawbacks, computer-mediated communication has changed the way people maintain relationships. Through the technological advancements that have taken place over the past twenty years, communication has evolved from handwritten letters to emails to text messaging to Facebook to Skype, significantly shortening response times with every step. The increased use and familiarity with technology, even as it evolves, will result in user's adaptation to computer mediated communication and reduce some of the advantages of face-to-face communication. However, the amount of time spent together improves the satisfaction in any relationship and face-to-face communication is still recommended whenever possible.

== Strategic and routine maintenance behaviors ==
Behavior patterns in a relationship can be classified as being strategic or routine. Both are common behaviors, though they are embodied in different ways and perhaps with different ulterior motives.

A strategic maintenance behavior is an action that is strategically carried out to help maintain a relationship. Phoning somebody to congratulate them on a birthday or anniversary is a deliberate action that shows affection for the other party in a relationship. These are clear strategic behaviors designed to give positive reinforcement.

A routine maintenance behavior is less strategic and has more to do with the everyday tasks in life. For example, if a wife is cleaning up from dinner, and her husband decides to take out the trash, this would be considered a routine maintenance behavior. They are used without the express purposes of maintaining a relationship, yet they still help people preserve their bonds with one another.

Statistically, couples have shown that routine maintenance means more to their relationship than strategic maintenance does. Part of this has to do with the difference in routine maintenance and an exchange relationship. The key difference being that benefits are given without one expected in return, as in an exchange relationship. From this perspective the maintenance and enhancement of close relationships depends on the extent that both people are concerned for each other's needs, and are willing and able to meet those needs.

The 1980s witnessed increased scholarly interest in maintenance communication. For example, communication strategies such as openness, avoidance, affinity-seeking, among a variety of other behaviors, were presented as maintenance communicative strategies. Stafford and Canary performed factor analyses on over 80 behaviors that the literature and married couples identified as maintenance behaviors. The results of the factor analysis yielded five maintenance strategies: positivity, openness, assurances, social networks, and sharing tasks. Education on relationship maintenance can help people to best understand how to take care of their interpersonal relationships. The real test of a relationship usually occurs when a conflict arises. Learning the tactics researchers have found to be successful regarding how to maintain a healthy, happy relationship can ensure a strong bond in personal relationships, despite hardships.

A lot of research on relationship maintenance has been conducted to better understand how people think, respond, and act in their personal relationships. Ayers (1983) defined relational maintenance as keeping a relationship in a stable state, thus preventing it from de-escalating or escalating. Ayers conducted a study that involved college students, both female and males. He gave these students a relationship scenario and asked them the probability of using 28 strategies that were created by the author and accompanied by undergraduate students' ideas to maintain the relationship in the given theoretical situation. The 28 strategies suggested three different issues. The first being, avoidance strategies, which included simply ignoring the things (big or small) that may occur in a relationship in order to not modify the relationship. The second issue being, balance strategies, which involved keeping balance present in the relationship such as keeping favors and emotional support steady and/or persistent. The final issue was directness strategies, which was where one of the two people in the relationship communicates that the relationship should remain unchanged. The most reported strategy was balance strategies followed by avoidance strategies then directness strategies regardless of the relationship condition (trying to maintain when partner wants to escalate, de-escalate, or maintain). This, regardless of perceived partner intent, individuals primarily maintain their relationship through balance and avoidance strategies rather than directness strategies.

== Knapp's relational development model ==
Knapp's relational development model outlines a form by which relationships are formed and dissolved. The building up and breaking down of relationships is given in ten stages. Maintenance in Knapp's model accounts for the struggle that exist between the fifth stage, bonding, and the sixth stage, differentiation.

Bonding allows a dyad to demonstrate to society that they are connected, such as through a marriage ceremony. Differentiation allows for individuals in the couple to maintain their personal space, such as through having their own friends, hobbies, or careers. Relationship maintenance exists in the delicate balance between bonding and differentiation. Should a couple begin to differentiate to a great degree, they will likely begin to fall into relationship dissolution.

Relationships in both romantic and business manners can be identified through ten steps, which Mark Knapp identified and named Knapp's relationship model. The first five steps involved are coming together stages known as escalation, and the latter five steps involved are termination or de-escalation model. The stages of a relationship can be compared to an elevator ride and how it goes either up to higher levels of intimacy, or goes down to termination. Time spent on each level may differ depending on speed of the relationship or intimacy shared. Different levels can remain at the highest stage. On the other hand, levels can be entirely skipped or surpassed. Researchers agree that relationships are always moving either forward or back, and communication indicators can determine the stage of the relationship.

=== Escalation stages ===
In developing and maintaining relationships, there are five stages of escalation: initiating, experimenting, intensifying, integrating, and bonding.

The initiating stage is the shortest and is composed of noticing and forming first impressions based on verbal and non-verbal communication. This stage usually involves small talk. Also often heavily based on physical appearances such as characteristics, clothing, and general presentation.

The experimenting stage involves finding a common ground by sharing interests and hobbies or other activities. Commonly asking questions such as "What do you do for fun" or "What do you study in school" are used to establish common grounds. This stage is usually a determining stage in deciding to move forward with the relationship or not.

Intensifying involves increased physical touch, especially in public. Much more time in private life is spent with the significant other. Individuals begin to look for more commitment. Feelings are beginning to be disclosed as intimate relationship forms.

At the integrating stage, the bond becomes closer into possible labels of boyfriend and girlfriend. People begin to see the dyad as a single unit. Relationship becomes very close and intimate. Words like "I" or "me" become "ours."

The bonding stage involves the declaration of status in a formal manner, such as legally becoming bonded as one. Commitments are made, and the partners support each other through difficult times. The relationship can only be broken through death or formal agreements.

=== Termination stages ===
There are termination stages which are contrary to the escalation stages. Termination can be sensed even before it happens through non-verbal cues such as a decrease in physical touch, eye contact, etc. The five termination stages are differentiation, circumscribing, stagnating, avoiding, and termination.

The differentiation stage is the beginning of the termination process beginning with a decrease in physical contact or the closeness of the escalation stages. A shift from shared identity changes over to individual identities. Distance grows between partners and pressure begins to build.

In the circumscribing stage, communication begins to become less frequent and transparent as boundaries are created. The decrease in communication is caused because of unwanted arguments. Rather than sharing problems, talk revolves around mundane topics. Lack of interest in this stage is still hard to pick up from outsider views. Space begins to grow and the relationship declines.

Through the stagnating stage, the relationship becomes shallow and boring with routines. Partners go through the routines, but do not care much for the outcome of the relationship. The lack of interest begins to show to friends and family through lack of communication both verbal and non-verbal. Much work needs to be done to recover to a healthy point if the relationship is to continue.

In the avoiding stage, the partners begin to avoid each other completely, restricting themselves from contact not just in person, but also via electronic communication.

The termination stage is the final point in de-escalation. Partners end their relationship formally and an agreement is reached, usually divorce for marriage situations. Conversations following the terminating stage are of practical matters such as how to divide property or legal matters. The terminating stage can be positive or negative. New beginnings can result after this stage.

After the termination stages runs its course, relationships often return to the friendship status or complete avoidance. If relationships started in the friendship stage and comes to an end in a positive note, friendship status is more likely to be achieved.

== See also ==
- Interpersonal communication relationship dissolution
- Relationship forming
- Socionics
