= Out-of-home placements =

Out-of-home placements are an alternative form of care when children must be removed from their homes. Children who are placed out of the home differ in the types and severity of maltreatment experienced compared to children who remain in the home. One-half to two-thirds of youth have experienced a traumatic event leading to increased awareness and growing literature on the impact of trauma on youth. The most common reasons for out-of-home placements are due to physical or sexual abuse, violence (including witnesses of parental violence), and neglect. Youth who are at risk in their own homes for abuse, neglect, or maltreatment, as well as youth with severe emotional and behavior issues, are placed out of the home with extended family and friends, foster care, or in residential facilities. Out-of-home placements aim to provide children with safety and stability. This temporary, safe environment allows youth to have their physical, mental, moral, and social needs met. However, these youth are in a vulnerable position for experiencing repeated abuse and neglect.

== Out-of-home placements ==
=== Foster care ===
According to the U.S. Department of Health and Human Services (2011), there were 408,425 youth in the United States in foster care in 2010. Foster care is a division of child welfare services that places a child in an interim home when parents or guardians are unable or unwilling to adequately care for the child or when the child has experienced a trauma by the guardians or parents. Ninety percent of foster care youth are exposed to trauma with the most common type of maltreatment being neglect or abuse. Abuse and neglect effect each child differently and create different stress reactions, however, these maltreatment types often occur together. Girls are more likely to be victims of sexual or emotional abuse, while boys are at an increased risk to experience violence or environmental trauma. While foster care placements are intended to be temporary, multiple placements often occur because of a child's multifaceted needs. For instance, in 2008, the average amount of time a child was in foster care was 15.3 months with an average of 3.2 placements. Youth in foster care who experience complex trauma have a higher probability of experiencing post-traumatic stress and a mental health diagnosis.

=== Residential care ===
Residential care is defined as a 24-hour placement where adolescents live away from the home and receive a higher level of treatment from mental health professionals who provide multidisciplinary services such as therapy and medication management. Similar to youth in foster care, residentially bound youth are difficult to treat due to behavioral and emotional regulation difficulties. Residential care is typically reserved for adolescents who are considered to be a danger to the community and themselves, requiring a structured and safe environment. These facilities are not only highly restrictive but are also the most expensive psychological service available. While effective treatment continues to be debated due to cost and restrictiveness, residential facilities continue to offer promise for youth who were unsuccessful in community settings.

Residential youth experience two to three times more family violence and physical or sexual abuse than the general population. The youth entering residential care have been exposed to at least one traumatic event, with an average of 5.8 events. Most of these individuals have also been removed from their home and have experienced at least one other out-of-home placement. Residential settings can intensify the trauma experienced because of the sudden, unexpected, and unfamiliar environment and nature of displacement. These settings are house youth that have experienced similar traumas, further putting the child at high risk for being triggered. The hopelessness of the new environment, seclusion, and restraint techniques utilized can also re-traumatize the youth.

=== Difference between foster care and residential youth ===
When comparing residential care to other out-of-home placements, youth tend to present with more negative symptoms. There is a positive association between how restricted a placement is and trauma symptoms. Youth in residential treatment have higher levels of internalizing and externalizing behaviors compared to youth in foster care. Children in foster care have more positive views about the care received. Although, some residential youth tend to prefer residential placement over foster care due to feeling more tense and unable to relax in a foster home with the foster parents taking on the role of their parent. Children who have experienced both residential and foster care further thought that biological children received preferential treatment leaving foster children feeling alienated.

== Impact on functioning ==
Impairments in emotional, cognitive, and behavioral functioning, along with deficits in development, mental health, and attachment behaviors are associated with traumatic experiences and are noticeably more prevalent in foster care and residential youth as they experience high rates of abuse and neglect.

=== Mental health ===
The traumatic experiences that the youth are exposed to increases the risk of a mental health diagnosis, such as post-traumatic stress disorder (PTSD), anxiety, and depression. Further, increased exposure to traumatic experiences results in a heighten risk of symptoms within the clinical range of dissociation, depression, and post-traumatic stress. Out-of-home placements place youth at risk for increased conduct, attention, and hyperactivity problems. Early exposure to complex trauma elevates the risk of suicidality, legal problems, and incarceration in adolescents and young adults. These experiences often manifest as depression and PTSD in females and substance abuse in males.

PTSD is associated with maltreatment, with sexual traumas being the most highly linked to PTSD. Youth in out-of-home placements experience PTSD at increased rates compared to youth in the general population. However, PTSD is not the most commonly diagnosed disorder in youth with exposure to trauma. Avoidance symptoms are less commonly displayed in younger children with PTSD and their memories of the traumatic event are demonstrated through play. These differences in symptom presentation can often lead to the misdiagnosis of PTSD. The prevalence rate for PTSD in youth placed in out-of-home-care is higher than youth who remained at home.

=== Cognitive impairments ===
A child's cognitive development is compromised by repeated abuse and neglect. Cognitive impairments suggest lower IQ, academic underachievement, as well as neurocognitive deficits. Other brain functions affected by maltreatment include motor development, attention, memory, executive functions, emotional regulation, and interpersonal relatedness. Biological changes in the central and autonomic nervous system also occur when the brain is constantly detecting and surviving threats, also known as survival mode.

=== Behavioral impairments ===
Both internalizing and externalizing problem behaviors are more likely with the experience of complex trauma. Aggressive behaviors, anger, conduct problems, and oppositional defiance are all associated with complex trauma. Outward aggressive behaviors are not necessarily intended to cause harm but are utilized as maladaptive attempts to cope or protect oneself from feelings of powerlessness, betrayal, and fears of abandonment. Youth exposed to trauma experience low self-esteem, high self-criticism, shame, difficulties in forming and maintaining interpersonal relationships, as well as academic struggles.

Exposure to early traumatic experiences, such as abuse and neglect, can have an impact on the child's development and behavior, creating impairments in overall health, mental health, and overall functioning in adulthood. Adults that were exposed to traumatic events in childhood are at an increased risk for chronic disease, suicidality, and mortality. Specific experiences of maltreatment heighten the likelihood of PTSD, anxiety, mood, and substance disorders throughout the lifespan.

== Specific trauma experiences in out-of-home placements ==
When a child is removed from their home at an early age, the child becomes more vulnerable, not only because of the new, unfamiliar setting, but also due to the nature of the removal and separation from a caregiver. The child's risk for developmental, mental, educational, and social issues also increases. Impairments in functioning may be heightened due to the loss of familiar surroundings and attachment disruption associated with out-of-home placements.

The primary challenge with early complex trauma experiences is the youth's ambivalent attitude toward future relationships with authority, adults, and unfamiliar peers. Abuse and neglect from parental figures often lead to insecure and disorganized attachment behavior due to the parent being the one the child needs to engage while simultaneously viewing that individual as frightening. Regulating their emotions, therefore, becomes difficult for the child because of the lack of a secure attachment that typically fosters healthy expression and control of emotions.

=== Betrayal trauma ===
Betrayal trauma occurs when youth are exposed to traumatic events by parents, caregivers, or legal guardians and is processed differently than abuse, violence, and neglect. Youth that have experienced betrayal trauma can recover with unconditional support from a caregiver, where a new, nurtured worldview can be formed.
