= Interpersonal relationship =

Acquaintance between people

In social psychology, an interpersonal relation (or interpersonal relationship) describes a social association, connection, or affiliation between two or more people. It overlaps significantly with the concept of social relations, which are the fundamental unit of analysis within the social sciences. Relations vary in degrees of intimacy, self-disclosure, duration, reciprocity, and power distribution. The main themes or trends of the interpersonal relations are: family, kinship, friendship, love, marriage, business, employment, clubs, neighborhoods, ethical values, support, and solidarity. Interpersonal relations may be regulated by law, custom, or mutual agreement, and form the basis of social groups and societies. They appear when people communicate or act with each other within specific social contexts, and they thrive on equitable and reciprocal compromises.

Interdisciplinary analysis of relationships draws heavily upon the other social sciences, including, but not limited to: anthropology, communication, cultural studies, economics, linguistics, mathematics, political science, social work, and sociology. This scientific analysis had evolved during the 1990s and has become "relationship science", through the research done by Ellen Berscheid and Elaine Hatfield. This interdisciplinary science attempts to provide evidence-based conclusions through the use of data analysis.

== Types ==
=== Friendship ===
Friendships are non-sexual, non-romantic interpersonal relationships. Social relations can be homosocial such as female bonding and male bonding or heterosocial such as cross-sex friendship. In some countries a reduction of friendships is observed, also called friendship recession or loneliness epidemic.

=== Intimate or sexual relationships ===
An intimate relationship is an interpersonal relationship that involves emotional or physical closeness between people and may include sexual intimacy and feelings of romance or love. Intimate relationships are interdependent, and the members of the relationship mutually influence each other. The quality and nature of the relationship depends on the interactions between individuals, and is derived from the unique context and history that builds between people over time.

==== Romantic relationships ====
Romantic relationships have been defined in countless ways, by writers, philosophers, religions, scientists, and in the modern day, relationship counselors. Theories of love include Sternberg's triangular theory of love and biology of romantic love. Sternberg defines love in terms of intimacy, passion, and commitment, which he claims exist in varying levels in different romantic relationships.

Romantic relationships can have great social and cultural variability, and may for example exist without any sexual intimacy, between people of any gender, or among a group of people, as in polyamory or open relationships.

==== Romance ====
While many individuals recognize the single defining quality of a romantic relationship as the presence of love, it is impossible for romantic relationships to survive without the component of interpersonal communication. Within romantic relationships, love is therefore equally difficult to define. Hazan and Shaver define love, using Ainsworth's attachment theory, as comprising proximity, emotional support, self-exploration, and separation distress when parted from the loved one. Other components commonly associated with love are physical attraction, similarity, reciprocity, and self-disclosure.

==== Life stages ====
Early adolescent relationships are characterized by companionship, reciprocity, and sexual experiences. As emerging adults mature, they begin to develop attachment and caring qualities in their relationships, including love, bonding, security, and support for partners. Earlier relationships also tend to be shorter and exhibit greater involvement with social networks. Later relationships are often marked by shrinking social networks, as the couple dedicates more time to each other than to associates. Later relationships also tend to exhibit higher levels of commitment.

Most psychologists and relationship counselors predict a decline of intimacy and passion over time, replaced by a greater emphasis on companionate love (differing from adolescent companionate love in the caring, committed, and partner-focused qualities). However, couple studies have found no decline in intimacy nor in the importance of sex, intimacy, and passionate love to those in longer or later-life relationships. Older people tend to be more satisfied in their relationships, but face greater barriers to entering new relationships than do younger or middle-aged people. Older women in particular face social, demographic, and personal barriers; men aged 65 and older are nearly twice as likely as women to be married, and widowers are nearly three times as likely to be dating 18 months following their partner's loss compared to widows.

==== Significant other ====
The term significant other gained popularity during the 1990s, reflecting the growing acceptance of 'non-heteronormative' relationships. It can be used to avoid making an assumption about the gender or relational status (e.g. married, cohabitating, civil union) of a person's intimate partner. Cohabiting relationships continue to rise, with many partners considering cohabitation to be nearly as serious as, or a substitute for, marriage. In particular, LGBTQ+ people often face unique challenges in establishing and maintaining intimate relationships. The strain of internalized discrimination, socially ingrained or homophobia, transphobia and other forms of discrimination against LGBTQ+ people, and social pressure of presenting themselves in line with socially acceptable gender norms can affect their health, quality of life, satisfaction, emotions etc. inside and outside their relationships. LGBTQ+ youth also lack the social support and peer connections enjoyed by hetero-normative young people. Nonetheless, comparative studies of homosexual and heterosexual couples have found few differences in relationship intensity, quality, satisfaction, or commitment.

==== Marital relationship ====
Although nontraditional relationships continue to rise, marriage still makes up the majority of relationships except among emerging adults. It is also still considered by many to occupy a place of greater importance among family and social structures.

=== Family relationships ===
==== Parent–child ====
In ancient times, parent–child relationships were often marked by fear, either of rebellion or abandonment, resulting in the strict filial roles in, for example, ancient Rome and China. Freud conceived of the Oedipal complex, the supposed obsession that young boys have towards their mothers and the accompanying fear and rivalry with their fathers, and the Electra complex, in which the young girl feels that her mother has castrated her and therefore becomes obsessed with her father. Freud's ideas influenced thought on parent–child relationships for decades.

Another early conception of parent–child relationships was that love only existed as a biological drive for survival and comfort on the child's part. In 1958, however, Harry Harlow's study "The Hot Wire Mother'' comparing rhesus' reactions to wire surrogate "mothers" and cloth "mothers" demonstrated that affection was wanted by any caregiver and not only the surrogate mothers.

The study laid the groundwork for Mary Ainsworth's attachment theory, showing how the infants used their cloth "mothers" as a secure base from which to explore. In a series of studies using the strange situation, a scenario in which an infant is separated from then reunited with the parent, Ainsworth defined three styles of parent-child relationship.

- Securely attached infants miss the parent, greet them happily upon return, and show normal exploration and lack of fear when the parent is present.
- Insecure avoidant infants show little distress upon separation and ignore the caregiver when they return. They explore little when the parent is present. Infants also tend to be emotionally unavailable.
- Insecure ambivalent infants are highly distressed by separation, but continue to be distressed upon the parent's return; these infants also explore little and display fear even when the parent is present.
- Some psychologists have suggested a fourth attachment style, disorganized, so called because the infants' behavior appeared disorganized or disoriented.

Secure attachments are linked to better social and academic outcomes and greater moral internalization as research proposes the idea that parent-child relationships play a key role in the developing morality of young children. Secure attachments are also linked to less delinquency for children, and have been found to predict later relationship success.

For most of the late nineteenth through the twentieth century, the perception of adolescent-parent relationships was that of a time of upheaval. G. Stanley Hall popularized the "Sturm und drang", or storm and stress, model of adolescence. Psychological research has painted a much tamer picture. Although adolescents are more risk-seeking and emerging adults have higher suicide rates, they are largely less volatile and have much better relationships with their parents than the storm and stress model would suggest. Early adolescence often marks a decline in parent-child relationship quality, which then re-stabilizes through adolescence, and relationships are sometimes better in late adolescence than prior to its onset. With the increasing average age at marriage and more youths attending college and living with parents past their teens, the concept of a new period called emerging adulthood gained popularity. This is considered a period of uncertainty and experimentation between adolescence and adulthood. During this stage, interpersonal relationships are considered to be more self-focused, and relationships with parents may still be influential.

==== Siblings ====
Sibling relationships have a profound effect on social, psychological, emotional, and academic outcomes. Although proximity and contact usually decreases over time, sibling bonds continue to have effect throughout their lives. Sibling bonds are one of few enduring relationships humans may experience. Sibling relationships are affected by parent-child relationships, such that sibling relationships in childhood often reflect the positive or negative aspects of children's relationships with their parents.

=== Professional ===
Business is generally held to be distinct from personal relations, a contrasting mode which other than excursions from the norm is based on non-personal interest and rational rather than emotional concerns.

- Business relationships
  - Partnership
  - Employer and employee
  - Contractor
  - Customer
  - Landlord and tenant
  - Co-worker

=== Other ===
- Alliance
- Enemy
- Frenemy — a person with whom an individual maintains a friendly interaction despite underlying conflict, possibly encompassing rivalry, mistrust, jealousy or competition
- Neighbor
- Familiar stranger
- Official

== Stages ==
Interpersonal relationships are dynamic systems that change continuously during their existence, and have a beginning, a lifespan, and an end. They tend to grow and improve gradually, as people become acquainted and become closer emotionally, or they gradually deteriorate as people drift apart, move on with their lives and form new relationships with others. One of the most influential models of relationship development was proposed by psychologist George Levinger. This model was formulated to describe heterosexual, adult romantic relationships, but it has been applied to other kinds of interpersonal relations as well. According to the model, the natural development of a relationship follows five stages:

1. Acquaintance and acquaintanceship – Becoming acquainted depends on previous relationships, physical proximity, first impressions, and a variety of other factors. If two people begin to like each other, continued interactions may lead to the next stage, but acquaintance can continue indefinitely. Another example is the association.
2. Buildup – During this stage, people begin to trust and care about each other. The need for intimacy, compatibility and such filtering agents as common background and goals will influence whether or not interaction continues.
3. Continuation – This stage follows a mutual commitment to quite a strong and close long-term friendship, romantic relationship, or even marriage. It is generally a long, relatively stable period. Nevertheless, continued growth and development will occur during this time. Mutual trust is important for sustaining the relationship.
4. Deterioration – Not all relationships deteriorate, but those that do tend to show signs of trouble. Boredom, resentment, and dissatisfaction may occur, and individuals may communicate less and avoid self-disclosure. Loss of trust and betrayals may take place as the downward spiral continues, eventually ending the relationship. (Alternately, the participants may find some way to resolve the problems and reestablish trust and belief in others.)
5. Ending – The final stage marks the end of the relationship, either by breakups, death or by spatial separation for quite some time and severing all existing ties of either friendship or romantic love.

=== Ways that interpersonal relationships begin ===
Proximity: Proximity increases the chance of repeated exposure to the same person. Long-term exposure that can develop familiarity is more likely to trigger like or hate.

Technological advance: The Internet removes the problem of lack of communication due to long distance. People can communicate with others who live far away from them through video calls or text. Internet is a medium for people to be close to others who are not physically near them.

Similarity: People prefer to make friends with others who are similar to them because their thoughts and feelings are more likely to be understood.

=== Terminating a relationship ===
According to the latest Systematic Review of the Economic Literature on the Factors associated with Life Satisfaction (dating from 2007), stable and secure relationships are beneficial, and correspondingly, relationship dissolution is harmful.

The American Psychological Association has summarized the evidence on breakups. Breaking up can actually be a positive experience when the relationship did not expand the self and when the breakup leads to personal growth. They also recommend some ways to cope with the experience:

- Purposefully focusing on the positive aspects of the breakup ("factors leading up to the break-up, the actual break-up, and the time right after the break-up")
- Minimizing the negative emotions
- Journaling the positive aspects of the breakup (e.g. "comfort, confidence, empowerment, energy, happiness, optimism, relief, satisfaction, thankfulness, and wisdom"). This exercise works best, although not exclusively, when the breakup is mutual.

Less time between a breakup and a subsequent relationship predicts higher self-esteem, attachment security, emotional stability, respect for your new partner, and greater well-being. Furthermore, rebound relationships do not last any shorter than regular relationships. 60% of people are friends with one or more ex. 60% of people have had an off-and-on relationship. 37% of cohabiting couples, and 23% of the married, have broken up and gotten back together with their existing partner.

Terminating a marital relationship implies divorce or annulment. One reason cited for divorce is infidelity. The determinants of unfaithfulness are debated by dating service providers, feminists, academics, and science communicators. According to Psychology Today, women's, rather than men's, level of commitment more strongly determines if a relationship will continue.

== Pathological relationships ==
=== Abusive ===
Abusive relationships involve either maltreatment or violence such as physical abuse, physical neglect, sexual abuse, and emotional maltreatment. Abusive relationships within the family are very prevalent in the United States and usually involve women or children as victims. Common individual factors for abusers include low self-esteem, poor impulse control, external locus of control, drug use, alcohol abuse, and negative affectivity. There are also external factors such as stress, poverty, and loss which contribute to likelihood of abuse.

=== Codependent ===
Codependency initially focused on a codependent partner enabling substance abuse, but it has become more broadly defined to describe a dysfunctional relationship with one or both partners having extreme dependence on or preoccupation with the relationship. For example, a narcissist and a sycophant with abandonment issues may create codependency as the narcissist values the flattery from the sycophant and the sycophant values the narcissist's approval. There are some who even refer to codependency as an addiction to the relationship. The focus of codependents tends to be on the emotional state, behavioral choices, thoughts, and beliefs of another person. Often those who are codependent neglect themselves in favor of taking care of others and have difficulty fully developing an identity of their own.

=== Narcissistic ===
Narcissists focus on themselves and often distance themselves from intimate relationships; the focus of narcissistic interpersonal relationships is to promote one's self-concept. Generally, narcissists show less empathy in relationships and view love pragmatically or as a game involving others' emotions.

Narcissists are usually part of the personality disorder, narcissistic personality disorder (NPD). In relationships, they tend to affect the other person as they attempt to use them to enhance their self-esteem. Specific types of NPD make a person incapable of having an interpersonal relationship due to their being cunning, envious, and contemptuous.

== Importance ==
Human beings are innately social and are shaped by their experiences with others. There are multiple perspectives to understand this inherent motivation to interact with others.

=== Need to belong ===
According to Maslow's hierarchy of needs, humans need to feel love (sexual/nonsexual) and acceptance from social groups (family, peer groups). In fact, the need to belong is so innately ingrained that it may be strong enough to overcome physiological and safety needs, such as children's attachment to abusive parents or staying in abusive romantic relationships. Such examples illustrate the extent to which the psychobiological drive to belong is entrenched.

=== Social exchange ===
Another way to appreciate the importance of relationships is in terms of a reward framework. This perspective suggests that individuals engage in relations that are rewarding in both tangible and intangible ways. The concept fits into a larger theory of social exchange. This theory is based on the idea that relationships develop as a result of cost–benefit analysis. Individuals seek out rewards in interactions with others and are willing to pay a cost for said rewards. In the best-case scenario, rewards will exceed costs, producing a net gain. This can lead to "shopping around" or constantly comparing alternatives to maximize the benefits or rewards while minimizing costs.

=== Relational self ===
Relationships are also important for their ability to help individuals develop a sense of self. The relational self is the part of an individual's self-concept that consists of the feelings and beliefs that one has regarding oneself that develops based on interactions with others. In other words, one's emotions and behaviors are shaped by prior relationships. Relational self theory posits that prior and existing relationships influence one's emotions and behaviors in interactions with new individuals, particularly those individuals that remind them of others in their life. Studies have shown that exposure to someone who resembles a significant other activates specific self-beliefs, changing how one thinks about oneself in the moment more so than exposure to someone who does not resemble one's significant other.

== Power and dominance ==
Power is the ability to influence the behavior of other people. When two parties have or assert unequal levels of power, one is termed "dominant" and the other "submissive". Expressions of dominance can communicate an intention to assert or maintain dominance in a relationship. Being submissive can be beneficial because it saves time, limits emotional stress, and may avoid hostile actions such as withholding of resources, cessation of cooperation, termination of the relationship, maintaining a grudge, or even physical violence. Submission occurs in different degrees; for example, some employees may follow orders without question, whereas others might express disagreement but concede when pressed.

Groups of people can form a dominance hierarchy. For example, a hierarchical organization uses a command hierarchy for top-down management. This can reduce time wasted in conflict over unimportant decisions, prevents inconsistent decisions from harming the operations of the organization, maintain alignment of a large population of workers with the goals of the owners (which the workers might not personally share) and, if promotion is based on merit, help ensure that the people with the best expertise make important decisions. This contrasts with group decision-making and systems which encourage decision-making and self-organization by front-line employees, who in some cases may have better information about customer needs or how to work efficiently. Dominance is only one aspect of organizational structure.

A power structure describes power and dominance relationships in a larger society. For example, a feudal society under a monarchy exhibits a strong dominance hierarchy in both economics and physical power, whereas dominance relationships in a society with democracy and capitalism are more complicated.

In business relationships, dominance is often associated with economic power. For example, a business may adopt a submissive attitude to customer preferences (stocking what customers want to buy) and complaints ("the customer is always right") in order to earn more money. A firm with monopoly power may be less responsive to customer complaints because it can afford to adopt a dominant position. In a business partnership a "silent partner" is one who adopts a submissive position in all aspects, but retains financial ownership and a share of the profits.

Two parties can be dominant in different areas. For example, in a friendship or romantic relationship, one person may have strong opinions about where to eat dinner, whereas the other has strong opinions about how to decorate a shared space. It could be beneficial for the party with weak preferences to be submissive in that area because it will not make them unhappy and avoids conflict with the party that would be unhappy.

The breadwinner model is associated with gender role assignments where the male in a heterosexual marriage would be dominant as they are responsible for economic provision.

== Relationship quality ==
Relationship quality refers to the perceived quality of a close relationship (i.e., romantic relationship, friendship, or family).

Relationship quality (sometimes used interchangeably with relationship satisfaction, relationship flourishing, or relationship happiness), in the context of close interpersonal relationships is generally defined as a reflection of a couple's overall feelings towards their relationship. More simply, it is the extent to which members in a relationship (romantic or otherwise) view their relationship as positive or negative.

The determinant of relationship quality is often a variety of self-reported evaluations of traits that make up relationship quality. For instance, feelings of closeness may be measured via questions that ask an individual to rate the extent to which they identify with statements. I.e., "I feel close to my partner", "I am comfortable sharing personal thoughts and feelings with my partner", etc. These questions are typically asked on a Likert scale and the average of those scores represents an individual's feelings of closeness toward their partner. Some scales are considered unidimensional and attempt to directly measure the construct of relationship quality. Other scales, considered multidimensional, repeat this process for other hypothesized components (e.g., closeness and satisfaction) before aggregating dimensions into a representative "relationship quality" score.

Historically, relationship quality has been the most commonly studied in the context of intimate romantic relationships. More recently, the study of relationship quality has extended to include other types of close relationships (see: friendships, family, sibling, parent). There is not always agreement among scholars about what domains should be included in the measurement of relationship quality, even within the different types of close relationships. Despite this, relationship quality and its predictors have been of popular interest to relationship scholars due to the range of psychological and relational outcomes that high quality relationships have been positively linked and associated with.

== Relationship satisfaction ==
Social exchange theory and Rusbult's investment model show that relationship satisfaction is based on three factors: rewards, costs, and comparison levels (Miller, 2012). Rewards refer to any aspects of the partner or relationship that are positive. Conversely, costs are the negative or unpleasant aspects of the partner or their relationship. The comparison level includes what each partner expects of the relationship. The comparison level is influenced by past relationships, and general relationship expectations they are taught by family and friends.

Individuals in long-distance relationships, LDRs, rated their relationships as more satisfying than individuals in proximal relationship, PRs. Alternatively, Holt and Stone (1988) found that long-distance couples who were able to meet with their partner at least once a month had similar satisfaction levels to unmarried couples who cohabitated. Also, the relationship satisfaction was lower for members of LDRs who saw their partner less frequently than once a month. LDR couples reported the same level of relationship satisfaction as couples in PRs, despite only seeing each other on average once every 23 days.

Social exchange theory and the am investment model both theorize that relationships that are high in cost would be less satisfying than relationships that are low in cost. LDRs have a higher level of costs than PRs, therefore, one would assume that LDRs are less satisfying than PRs. Individuals in LDRs are more satisfied with their relationships compared to individuals in PRs. This can be explained by unique aspects of the LDRs, how the individuals use relationship maintenance behaviors, and the attachment styles of the individuals in the relationships. Therefore, the costs and benefits of the relationship are subjective to the individual, and people in LDRs tend to report lower costs and higher rewards in their relationship compared to PRs.

=== Theories and empirical research ===
==== Confucianism ====
Confucianism is a study and theory of relationships, especially within hierarchies. Social harmony—the central goal of Confucianism—results in part from every individual knowing their place in the social order and playing their part well. Particular duties arise from each person's particular situation in relation to others. The individual stands simultaneously in several different relationships with different people: as a junior in relation to parents and elders; and as a senior in relation to younger siblings, students, and others. Juniors are considered in Confucianism to owe their seniors reverence and seniors have duties of benevolence and concern toward juniors. A focus on mutuality is prevalent in East Asian cultures to this day.

==== Minding relationships ====
The mindfulness theory of relationships shows how closeness in relationships may be enhanced. Minding is the "reciprocal knowing process involving the nonstop, interrelated thoughts, feelings, and behaviors of persons in a relationship." Five components of "minding" include:

1. Knowing and being known: seeking to understand the partner
2. Making relationship-enhancing attributions for behaviors: giving the benefit of the doubt
3. Accepting and respecting: empathy and social skills
4. Maintaining reciprocity: active participation in relationship enhancement
5. Continuity in minding: persisting in mindfulness

== In popular culture ==
=== Popular perceptions ===
Popular perceptions of intimate relationships are strongly influenced by movies and television. Common messages are that love is predestined, love at first sight is possible, and that love with the right person always succeeds. Those who consume the most romance-related media tend to believe in predestined romance and that those who are destined to be together implicitly understand each other. These beliefs, however, can lead to less communication and problem-solving as well as giving up on relationships more easily when conflict is encountered.

=== Social media ===
Social media has changed the face of interpersonal relationships. Romantic interpersonal relationships are no less impacted. For example, in the United States, Facebook has become an integral part of the dating process for emerging adults. Social media can have both positive and negative impacts on romantic relationships. For example, supportive social networks have been linked to more stable relationships. However, social media usage can also facilitate conflict, jealousy, and passive-aggressive behaviors such as spying on a partner. Aside from direct effects on the development, maintenance, and perception of romantic relationships, excessive social network usage is linked to jealousy and dissatisfaction in relationships.

Another common behavior in online communities, including dating, is lurking. Lurking means watching communities without posting or replying. Some say it means never posting, while others say even small posts count (Neelen & Fetter, 2010; Golder & Donath, 2004). Lurking is often seen negatively, tied to "freeloading" (Preece, Nonnecke, & Andrews, 2004), but others see it as valid participation. Lurking depends on personal goals, personality, and group dynamics. For example, introverts tend to lurk more, and people with higher tech confidence participate more (Ross et al., 2009; Sun, Rau, & Ma, 2014). Studies show up to 90% of users may lurk at some point (Muller, 2012). Lurking can help gather info or support without interacting, but it can make a community seem less active, Lurking can make online relationships feel one-sided because it reduces interaction. When someone just watches without joining in, it can create distance and make it harder to build trust. This can slow down the growth of a real connection. Understanding lurking can help encourage more participation (Yeow, Johnson, & Faraj, 2006).

A growing segment of the population is engaging in purely online dating, sometimes but not always moving towards traditional face-to-face interactions. These online relationships differ from face-to-face relationships; for example, self-disclosure may be of primary importance in developing an online relationship. Conflict management differs, since avoidance is easier and conflict resolution skills may not develop in the same way. Additionally, the definition of infidelity is both broadened and narrowed, since physical infidelity becomes easier to conceal but emotional infidelity (e.g. chatting with more than one online partner) becomes a more serious offense.

== See also ==
- Attachment in adults – Application of the theory of attachment to adults
- I and Thou – 1923 book by Martin Buber
- Interactionism – Sociological theory
- Interpersonal attraction – Study of the attraction between people that leads to friendship or romance
- Interpersonal tie
- Loneliness – Unpleasant emotional response to social or physical isolation
- Outline of relationships – Overview of and topical guide to relationships
- Queerplatonic relationship – Non-romantic intimate partnerships
- Relational mobility – Sociological variable
- Relational models theory – Theory of interpersonal relationships
- Relationship forming
- Relationship science – Field dedicated to the scientific study of interpersonal relationship processes
- Relationship status
- Social connection – Experience of feeling close and connected to others
- Socionics – Pseudoscientific personality theory
- Transactional analysis – Theory and practice of a type of psychological analysis
