= Romantic friendship =

Very close; non-sexual relationship between friends

A romantic friendship (also passionate friendship or affectionate friendship) is a very close but typically non-sexual relationship between friends, often involving a degree of physical closeness beyond that which is common in contemporary Western societies. It may include, for example, holding hands, cuddling, hugging, kissing, giving massages, or sharing a bed, without sexual intercourse or other sexual expression.

The term is used in historical scholarship to describe emotionally intimate same-sex relationships that occurred before the establishment of homosexuality as a sexual identity. It was coined in the later 20th century to retrospectively define a type of relationship which, until the mid-19th century, had been considered unremarkable, but had become rarer as physical intimacy between non-sexual partners became increasingly taboo. Romantic friendship between women in Europe and North America became especially prevalent in the late 18th and early 19th centuries with the simultaneous emergence of female education and a new rhetoric of sexual difference.

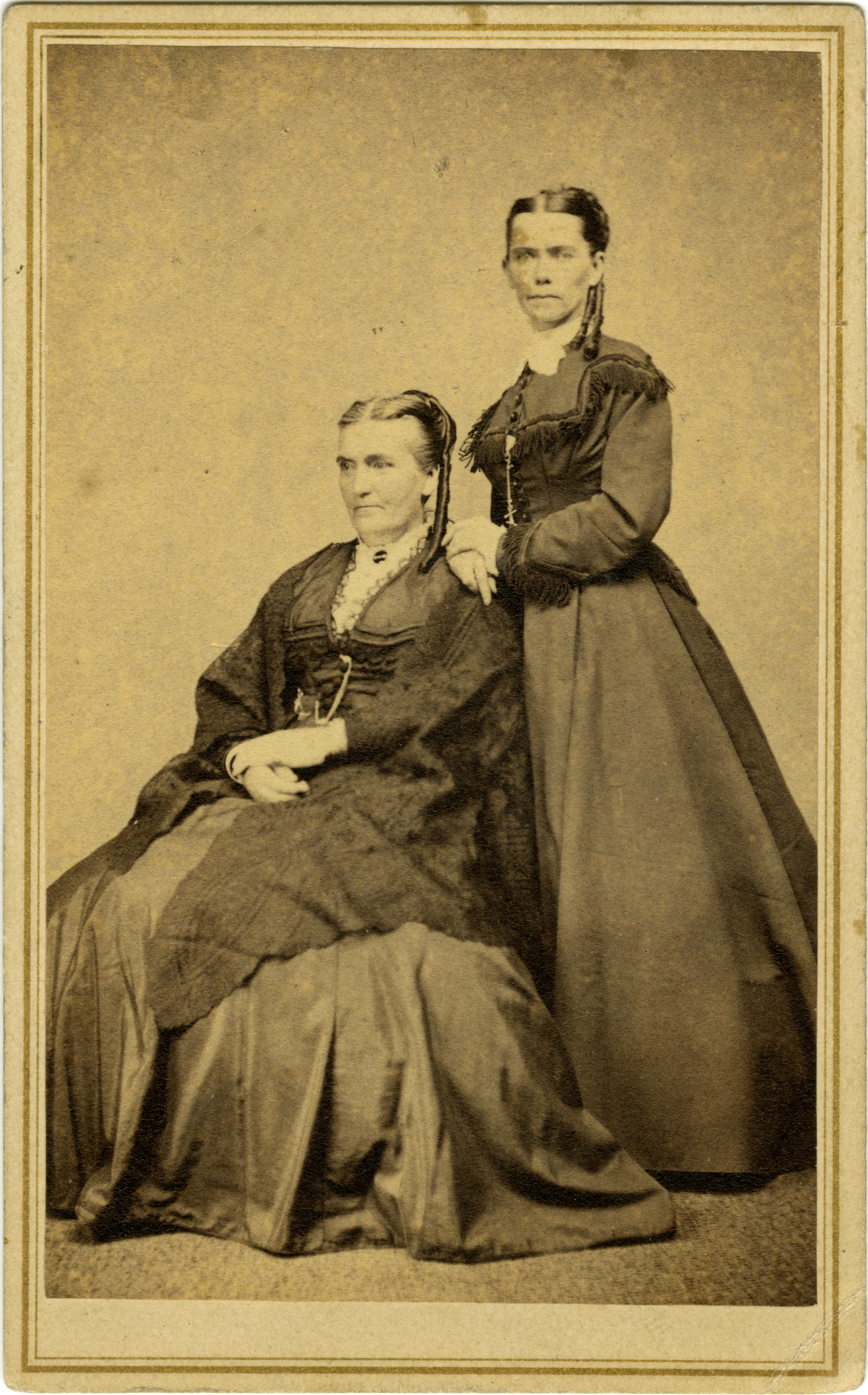
Shimer College founders Cindarella Gregory and Frances Shimer in 1869; their extremely close relationship has been characterized as a "passionate friendship".

== Historical examples ==
The study of historical romantic friendship is difficult because the primary source material consists of writing about love relationships, which typically took the form of love letters, poems, or philosophical essays rather than objective studies and seldom explicitly stated the sexual or nonsexual nature of relationships. Though taboos against homosexuality in Western European cultures at the time may have motivated same-sex lovers to conceal the nature of their relationships, Lillian Faderman, Stephanie Coontz, Anthony Rotundo, Douglas Bush, and others argue that the rarity of romantic friendship in modern culture means that references to nonsexual relationships may be misinterpreted by modern readers.

=== Shakespeare and the "Fair Youth" ===
The content of Shakespeare's works has raised the question of whether he may have been bisexual. Although 26 of Shakespeare's sonnets are love poems addressed to a married woman (the "Dark Lady"), 126 are addressed to an adolescent boy (known as the "Fair Youth"). The tone of the latter group, which focuses on the boy's beauty, has been interpreted as evidence for Shakespeare's bisexuality, although others interpret them as referring to intense friendship or fatherly affection, not sexual love.

Among those of the latter interpretation, in the preface to his 1961 Pelican edition, Douglas Bush writes:

Since modern readers are unused to such ardor in masculine friendship and are likely to leap at the notion of homosexuality ... we may remember that such an ideal, often exalted above the love of women, could exist in real life, from Montaigne to Sir Thomas Browne, and was conspicuous in Renaissance literature.

Bush cites Montaigne, who distinguished male friendships from "that other, licentious Greek love", as evidence of a platonic interpretation.

In his discussion of Bush's contention that the sonnets are an expression of intense, idealised, non-sexual friendship, what he calls the "Renaissance cult of [male] friendship", Crompton, in Homosexuality and Civilization, points to the sonnets' complaints of "sleepless nights", "sharp anguish", and "fearful jealousy" arising from love of the fair youth. Crompton concludes these are "torments" such that "friendship hardly could" cause. He notes also that the writer C. S. Lewis, though not a proponent of a homosexual interpretation, did find the sonnets' language "too lover-like for ordinary male friendship" and declared himself unable to find any comparable language used between friends elsewhere in 16th-century literature.

=== Montaigne and Etienne de La Boétie ===
The French philosopher Montaigne described the concept of romantic friendship (without using this English term) in his essay "On Friendship". In addition to distinguishing this type of love from homosexuality ("this other Greek licence"), another way in which Montaigne differed from the modern view was that he felt that friendship and platonic emotion were a primarily masculine capacity (apparently unaware of the custom of female romantic friendship which also existed):

Seeing (to speake truly) that the ordinary sufficiency of women cannot answer this conference and communication, the nurse of this sacred bond: nor seem their minds strong enough to endure the pulling of a knot so hard, so fast, and durable.

Lesbian-feminist historian Lillian Faderman cites Montaigne, using "On Friendship" as evidence that romantic friendship was distinct from homosexuality, since the former could be extolled by famous and respected writers, who simultaneously disparaged homosexuality. (The quotation also furthers Faderman's beliefs that gender and sexuality are socially constructed, since they indicate that each sex has been thought of as "better" at intense friendship in one or another period of history.)

=== Alexander Hamilton and John Laurens ===
Shortly after his marriage, while in George Washington's camp during the American Revolutionary Era, John Laurens met and became extremely close friends with Alexander Hamilton. They exchanged many letters during the several years when different assignments and Laurens's capture by the British kept them apart; for example, when the terms of Laurens's parole prevented him from being present at Hamilton's wedding to Elizabeth Schuyler in December 1780, even though Hamilton had invited him. While emotional language was not uncommon in romantic friendships among those of the same gender in this historical period, Hamilton biographer James Thomas Flexner stated that the intensely expressive language contained in the Hamilton-Laurens letters "raises questions concerning homosexuality" that "cannot be categorically answered".

Stating that "one must tread gingerly in approaching this matter," Hamilton biographer Ron Chernow wrote that it is impossible to say "with any certainty" that Laurens and Hamilton were lovers, noting that such an affair would have required the exercise of "extraordinary precautions" because sodomy was a capital offense throughout the colonies at the time. Chernow concluded that based on available evidence, "At the very least, we can say that Hamilton developed something like an adolescent crush on his friend." According to Chernow, "Hamilton did not form friendships easily and never again revealed his interior life to another man as he had to Laurens", and after Laurens's death, "Hamilton shut off some compartment of his emotions and never reopened it."

In contrast to Hamilton's effusive letters, surviving letters from Laurens to Hamilton were notably less frequent and less passionately worded, although some letters written by Laurens have been lost or may have been destroyed.

=== Abraham Lincoln and Joshua Speed ===
The relationship between Abraham Lincoln and Joshua Speed is another example of a relationship that some modern sources consider ambiguously or potentially gay, while others maintain it was a romantic friendship. Lincoln and Speed lived together for a time, shared a bed in their youth and maintained a lifelong friendship. David Herbert Donald pointed out that men at that time often shared beds for financial reasons; men were accustomed to same-sex non-sexual intimacy, since most parents could not afford separate beds or rooms for male siblings. Anthony Rotundo argues that the custom of romantic friendship for men in America in the early 19th century was different from that of Renaissance France, and it was expected that men would distance themselves emotionally and physically somewhat after marriage; he claims that letters between Lincoln and Speed show this distancing after Lincoln married Mary Todd. Such distancing is still practiced today.

=== Romantic friendships in women's colleges ===
As the American suffrage movement succeeded in gaining rights for white middle- and upper-class women, heterosexual marriage became less of a necessity, and many more women went to college and continued to live in female-centric communities after graduation. The all-women peer culture formed at women's colleges allowed students to create their own social rules and hierarchies, to become each other's leaders and heroes, and to idolize each other. These idolizations often took the forms of romantic friendships, which contemporaries called "smashes", "crushes" and "spoons".

The practice of "smashing" involved one student showering another with gifts: notes, chocolates, sometimes even locks of hair. When the object of the student's affections was wooed and the two of them began spending all their time together, the "aggressor" was perceived by her friends as "smashed". In the early twentieth century, "crush" gradually replaced the term "smash", and generally signified a younger girl's infatuation with an older peer. Historian Susan Van Dyne has documented an "intimate friendship" between Mary Mathers and Frona Brooks, two members of the Smith College class of 1883. Mathers and Brooks exchanged tokens of affection, relished time spent alone together, and celebrated an anniversary.

Romantic friendships kindled in women's colleges sometimes continued after graduation, with women living together in "Boston marriages" or cooperative houses. Women who openly committed themselves to other women often found acceptance of their commitment and lifestyle in academic fields, and felt comfortable expressing their feelings for their same-sex companions.

At the turn of the century, smashes and crushes were considered an essential part of the women's college experience, and students who wrote home spoke openly about their involvement in romantic friendships. By the 1920s, however, public opinion had turned against crushes.

== Biblical and religious arguments ==
Proponents of the romantic friendship hypothesis also make reference to the Bible. Historians like Faderman and Robert Brain believe that the descriptions of relationships such as David and Jonathan or Ruth and Naomi in this religious text establish that the customs of romantic friendship existed and were thought of as virtuous in the ancient Near East, despite the simultaneous taboo on homosexuality.

The relationship between King David and Jonathan, son of King Saul, is often cited as an example of male romantic friendship; for example, Faderman paraphrases 2 Samuel 1:26 on the title page of her book: "Your love was wonderful to me, passing the love of women." Biblical scholar Theodore Jennings emphasizes that Jonathan's affection for David started out as love at first sight brought about by David's beauty, concluding this is no brotherly love but a feeling tinged with eroticism.

Ruth and her mother-in-law Naomi are the female Biblical pair most often cited as a possible romantic friendship, as in the following verse commonly used in same-sex wedding ceremonies:

Entreat me not to leave you or to return from following you; for where you go I will go, and where you lodge I will lodge; your people shall be my people, and your God my God; where you die I will die, and there will I be buried.

Faderman writes that women in Renaissance and Victorian times made reference to both Ruth and Naomi and "Davidean" friendship as the basis for their romantic friendships.

While some authors, notably John Boswell, have claimed that ecclesiastical practice in earlier ages blessed "same-sex unions", others maintain that this is categorically impossible given their understanding of individuals’ and officiants’ mores and values. Boswell notes that past relationships are ambiguous; when describing Greek and Roman attitudes, Boswell states that "[A] consensual physical aspect would have been utterly irrelevant to placing the relationship in a meaningful taxonomy." Boswell's work has received much criticism. Brent D. Shaw, who is incidentally gay himself, noted some of the differences between the two types of solemnized relationships in a review written for The New Republic:

Given the centrality of Boswell's new evidence, therefore, it is best to begin by describing his documents and their import. These documents are liturgies for an ecclesiastical ritual called adelphopoiesis or, in simple English, the "creation of a brother." Whatever these texts are, they are not texts for marriage ceremonies. Boswell's translation of their titles (akolouthia eis adelphopoiesin and parallels) as "The Order of Celebrating the Union of Two Men" or "Office for Same-Sex Union" is inaccurate. In the original, the titles say no such thing. And this sort of tendentious translation of the documents is found, alas, throughout the book. Thus the Greek words that Boswell translates as "be united together" in the third section of the document quoted above are, in fact, rather ordinary words that mean "become brothers" (adelphoi genesthai); and when they are translated in this more straightforward manner, they impart a quite different sense to the reader.

Such agreements and rituals are "same-sex" in the sense that it is two men who are involved, and they are "unions" in the sense that the two men involved are co-joined as "brothers." But that is it. There is no indication in the texts themselves that these are marriages in any sense that the word would mean to readers now, nor in any sense that the word would have meant to persons then: the formation of a common household, the sharing of everything in a permanent co-residential unit, the formation of a family unit wherein the two partners were committed, ideally, to each other, with the intent to raise children, and so on.

Although it is difficult to state precisely what these ritualized relationships were, most historians who have studied them are fairly certain that they deal with a species of "ritualised kinship" that is covered by the term "brotherhood." (This type of "brotherhood" is similar to the ritualized agreements struck between members of the Mafia or other "men of honour" in our own society.) That explains why the texts on adelphopoiesis in the prayerbooks are embedded within sections dealing with other kinship-forming rituals, such as marriage and adoption. Giovanni Tomassia in the 1880s and Paul Koschaker in the 1930s, whose works Boswell knows and cites, had already reached this conclusion.

Historian Robert Brain has also traced these ceremonies from Pagan "blood brotherhood" ceremonies through medieval Catholic ceremonies called "gossipry" or "siblings before God", on to modern ceremonies in some Latin American countries referred to as "compadrazgo"; Brain considers the ceremonies to refer to romantic friendship.

== Reception in 1990s American gay and lesbian subculture ==
Several small groups of advocates and researchers have advocated for the renewed use of the term, or the related term Boston marriage, today. Several lesbian, gay, and feminist authors (such as Lillian Faderman, Stephanie Coontz, Jaclyn Geller and Esther Rothblum) have conducted academic research on the topic; these authors typically favor the social constructionist view that sexual orientation is a modern, culturally constructed concept.

Sharon Marcus, in her 2007 book published by Princeton UP, Between Women: Friendship, Desire, and Marriage in Victorian England, continued this line of queer feminist thought on romantic friendships, specifically in the context of 19th-century England. In a review, Matt Houlbrook noted Marcus's eschewal of contemporary identity constructions, "In displacing the 'lesbian' from its field of view, this book is a powerful shining example of what 'becomes thinkable' if contemporary identity categories—even identity itself—are set aside."

== See also ==
- Asexuality
- Bromance
- Casual dating
- Courtly love
- Class S (genre)
- Cross-sex friendship
- Dating
- Emotional affair
- Heterosociality
- Homosociality
- Intimate relationship
- Love
- Platonic love
- Queerplatonic relationship
- Romance (love)
- Romantic orientation
- Same-sex relationship
- Womance
- Work spouse
