= Housewife (disambiguation) =

A housewife is a wife who stays at home, as a homemaker, and frequently, a mother. It also refers to a cloth case or bag for needles, thread, etc.

Housewife, housewives, or similar, may also refer to:

- Housewife (film), a 1934 U.S. drama film
- "Housewife", a 2004 song by Daan
- "Housewife", a 1999 song by Dr. Dre
- "Housewife" (Tate McRae song), a 2026 song by Tate McRae
- "Housewife" (The Cribs song), a 2004 song by The Cribs
- Housewife (band), an indie band from Toronto formerly known as Moscow Apartment
- The Housewife, a 2026 American biographical drama film

== See also ==
- Desperate Housewives, a U.S. drama TV show
- The Real Housewives, a reality television franchise
- Housewife of the Year, a mid-to-late-20th century Irish pageant
- The Compleat Housewife, an 18th century cookbook
- Today's Housewife, an early-20th century magazine
- House Husband (disambiguation)
- Work wife
- Ex-wife (disambiguation)
- House (disambiguation)
- Wife (disambiguation)
