= Ghar =

Ghar or GHAR may refer to:

- Ghar (1978 film), a Bollywood film starring Vinod Mehra
- Ghar (2019 film), a Nepali horror film
- "Ghar", a song by Anurag Saikia, Varun Jain and Romy from the 2025 Indian film The Diplomat
- Ghar, Iran, a village in Razavi Khorasan Province, Iran
- Ghar, Gurdaspur, a village in Gurdaspur district of Punjab State, India
- Ghar al Milh, a coastal town and former port in northeastern Tunisia
- Għar Dalam, a prehistorical cul de sac located on the outskirts of Birżebbuġa, Malta
- Ghar al Milh, a coastal town and former port in northeastern Tunisia
- Għar Dalam, a prehistorical cul de sac located on the outskirts of Birżebbuġa, Malta
- Grab Hands and Run, a 1995 novel by Frances Temple
- Ghar Banduk Biryani, a 2023 Indian comedy film by Hemant Jangal Awtade

== See also ==
- Ghara (disambiguation)
- Ghar Ek Mandir (disambiguation)
- Ghar Ki Izzat (disambiguation)
- Ghar Jamai (disambiguation)
- Ghanta Ghar (disambiguation)
- Hamara Ghar (disambiguation)
- Aaj Ka Ye Ghar (lit. 'Modern Home'), a 1976 Indian film
