= Wife (disambiguation) =

A wife is a female participant in a marriage.

Wife, WIFE, or wives may also refer to:

== Literature and stage ==
- A Wife, a 1614 poem by Sir Thomas Overbury
- "The Wife", an 1819 essay by Washington Irving from The Sketch Book of Geoffrey Crayon, Gent.
- Wife (novel), a 1975 novel by Bharati Mukherjee
- The Wife (novel), a 2003 novel by Meg Wolitzer
- The Wife, a 2018 novel by Alafair Burke
- The Wife (play), an 1833 play by James Sheridan Knowles
- Wife (play), a 2019 play by Samuel Adamson

== Film and TV ==
- Wife (film), a 1953 film directed by Mikio Naruse
- The Wife (1995 film), a 1995 film by Tom Noonan
- The Wife (2017 film), a 2017 film based on Meg Wolitzer's novel with Glenn Close in the title role
- The Wife (2021 film), a 2021 Indian Hindi-language horror film
- The Wife (TV series), a 2022 South African telenovela from Showmax
- "The Wife" (Seinfeld), an episode of the NBC sitcom Seinfeld
- Wives (牽手), a Taiwanese TV series

== Music ==
=== Musicians ===
- Wife (musician), electronic music alias of James Kelly
- Wives (band), American punk band

=== Songs ===
- "Wife" (song), 2024 song by South Korean girl group (G)I-dle
- "Wife", song by Jay Chou from the 2000 album Jay
- "Wife", song by Mitski from the album Lush
- "The Wife", track by Jesper Kyd from the 2018 Indian film Tumbbad

== Broadcast stations ==
- WIFE-FM, a radio station (94.3 FM) licensed to serve Rushville, Indiana, which has identified as WIFE-FM since 2007
- WIFE-FM (Indianapolis), a former radio station (107.9 FM) licensed to serve Indianapolis, Indiana, from 1963 to 1976
- WTLC (AM), a radio station (1310 AM) licensed to serve Indianapolis, Indiana, which held the call sign WIFE from 1963 to 1976
- WKEF, a television station (channel 22) licensed to serve Dayton, Ohio, which held the call sign WIFE (TV) from 1953 to 1959
- WTUE, a radio station (104.7 FM) licensed to serve Dayton, Ohio, which held the call sign WIFE (FM) from 1959 to 1961
- WLPK, a radio station (1580 AM) licensed to serve Connersville, Indiana, which held the call sign WIFE from 1983 to 1994

== See also ==
- Common-law wife
- Housewife (disambiguation)
- Work wife
- Ex-wife (disambiguation)
- Waifu
