= House Husband (disambiguation) =

A house husband is a husband who stays at home, as a homemaker, and frequently, a father.

House husband, househusband, or variation, may also refer to:

== Television ==
- House Husbands (TV show), Australian TV show
- Mr. House Husband (TV show), a South Korean TV show
- "House Husband" (episode), a 2017 TV episode of Maynila; see List of Maynila episodes
- "The Househusband" (German: Der Hausmann), an episode of Fokus Deutsch

== Other uses ==
- My House Husband (film), a 2011 Philippine dramedy film
- Bad Housewife (film), a 2005 South Korean film also released as "House Husband"
- "House Husband" (song), a 2002 song by Prick off the album The Wreckard
- "House Husband" (song), a 1999 song by Shabba Ranks off the album Golden Touch (album)
- The House Husband (book), a 1996 novel by Norma Curtis
- The House Husband (book), a 2017 novel by James Patterson; see James Patterson bibliography

== See also ==
- The Way of the Househusband, a Japanese manga comic book
- Hausmann, a surname meaning househusband
- Work husband
- Gharana Mogudu (lit. 'House Husband'), a 1992 Indian Telugu-language film by K. Raghavendra Rao
- Ghar Jamai (disambiguation)
- Housewife (disambiguation)
- Husband (disambiguation)
- House (disambiguation)
