= Elizabeth Kimball Kendall =

American professor (1855–1952)

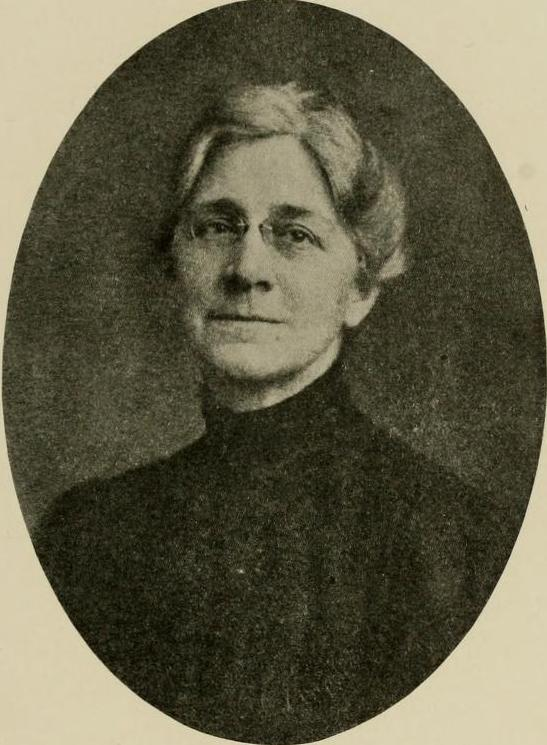
Kendall c. 1914

Elizabeth Kimball Kendall (7 April 1855 – 21 May 1952) was an American professor of history and political science at Wellesley College. She made several journeys across Europe and Asia. These included a 1911 voyage across China, her account of which, A Wayfarer in China: Impressions of a Trip Across West China and Mongolia, was published in 1913. For this book and her travels, she was named Fellow of the Royal Geographical Society.

Although she was born in Vermont, much of Kendall's early education was in Europe, where her father was a United States consul; she studied in Germany and France as well as at Oxford University. She later acquired a degree in law from Boston University and an M.A. from Radcliffe College. Joining Wellesley in 1879 as an instructor, Kendall became associate professor in 1892 and full professor in 1902. At Wellesley, she taught a number of courses in history and political science and wrote several books, including three co-authored with Katharine Coman. Kendall traveled frequently, making trips to Turkey, Dalmatia, Mongolia, England, India, and most notably, China, which she visited several times. After retiring from Wellesley in 1920, Kendall taught at Yenching University in Beijing and lived at different times in China, the United States, and England, where she died.

== Biography ==
Born on 7 April 1855 in Middlebury, Vermont, Kendall was the second daughter of Lucretia Hasseltine Kendall and Reuben Safford Kendall. She had two siblings: an older sister, Lucretia Hasseltine, and a younger brother, Francis Lockwood. Her mother taught at several American universities and, according to historian Patricia Palmieri, influenced her daughter's views. Kendall lived with her while teaching at Wellesley until her death in 1911. Kendall's father was a minister and a consul of the United States in Europe, in 1871 at Strasbourg, and from 1872 to 1873 in Brindisi. He died in 1873 in Geneva. Her family lived in Europe while her father was consul as well as after his death, and Kendall's early studies took place in Germany and France.

In 1879, having returned to the United States, Kendall began as an instructor at Wellesley College; at different times, she taught French, German, history and political science in this role. From 1885 to 1887, she went to study history at Oxford University. She joined the Department of History in 1888, where she taught Wellesley's only political science course, as well as a course in constitutional law from 1891 to 1896. She also helped create the Agora Society in 1891, which sponsored a number of events related to politics and rhetoric to "create a higher ideal of womanhood". In 1892, she received a law degree from Boston University, and in 1899 an M.A. from Radcliffe College. Kendall became an associate professor in 1892. In 1902, she became a full professor and the head of Wellesley's Department of History.

Kendall traveled widely while teaching at Wellesley, having earlier "pursued impressions and experiences in the Far West on the frontier" which inspired her travels. In 1904, she went to India to study the British Raj. Her first visit to China was in 1911, which formed the basis of her work A Wayfarer in China. In 1914, Kendall visited Turkey and in 1915 Guizhou and Guangxi in China. In 1917, she went to Tibet. Beginning in Shanghai, she took a train through Xuzhou and Kaifeng to reach northwest Henan. From there, she traveled by cart to Tibet across Shaanxi and Gansu. She returned to Shanghai by boat on the Han River and then by train through Kaifeng, Xuzhou, and Pukou. Kendall was accompanied throughout her journeys by her dog Jack. Her boldness and independence served as a model for others at Wellesley.

Kendall retired as professor of history at Wellesley in 1920, becoming professor emeritus. In the same year, Wellesley established a chair in her name. After her retirement, Kendall visited China again and taught at the Yenching University in Beijing, which had become a sister college of Wellesley in 1921. Having stayed in China for six years, she then lived in England until World War II began in 1939, when she returned to the United States. Kendall died on 21 May 1952 in England, where she had gone to live with her niece the year before.

== Notable works ==
Kendall co-authored three books with Katharine Coman: The Growth of the English Nation, published in 1894; A History of England for High Schools and Academies, published in 1899; and A Short History of England for School Use, published in 1901. The last of these was based on research that Coman conducted in England between 1886 and 1894. Kendall also compiled a number of original documents from English history into a book titled Source-Book of English History, which was published in 1900.

=== A Wayfarer in China ===
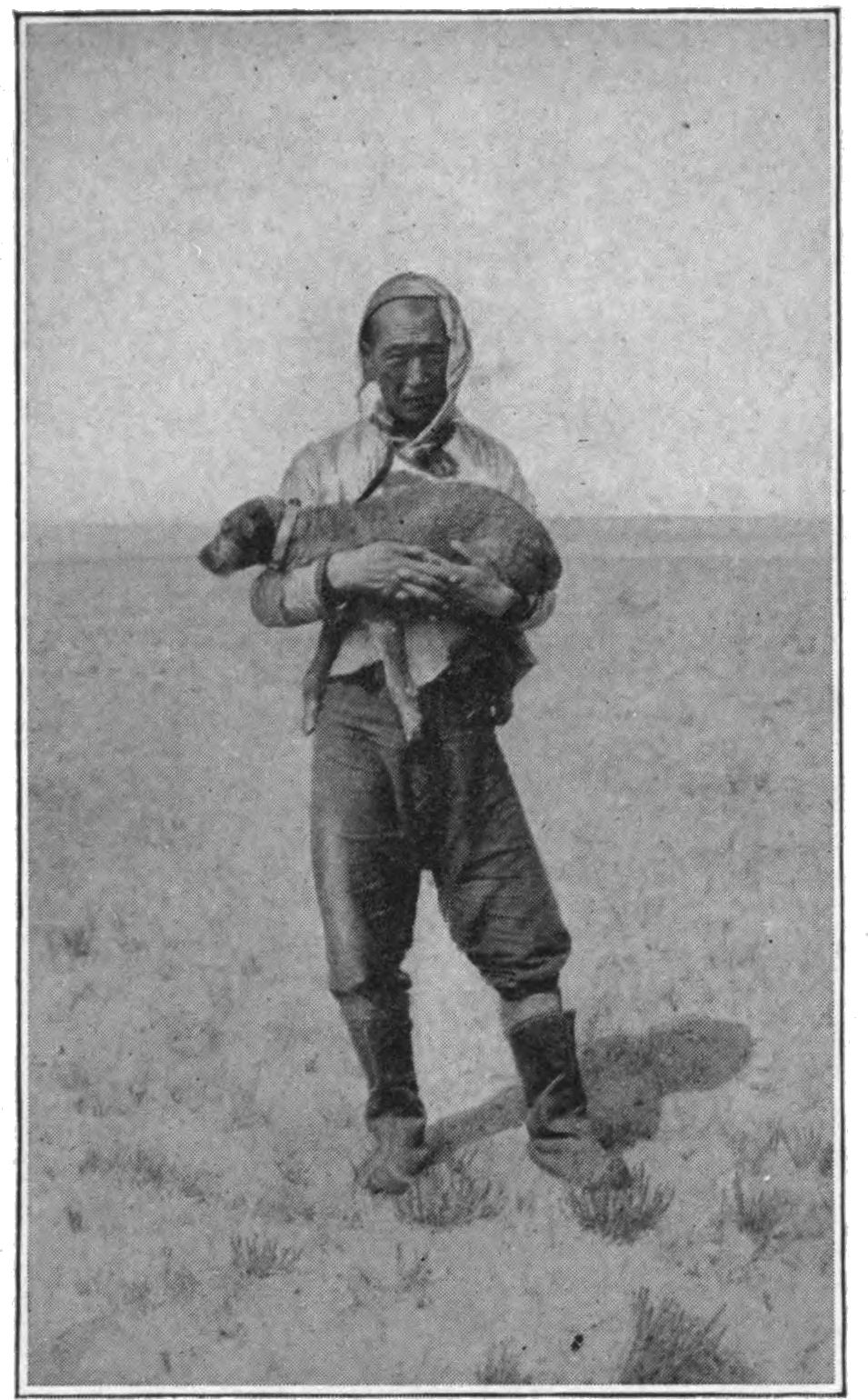
Kendall's dog Jack is held by a lama.

In 1911, Kendall embarked on a journey across Europe and Asia, taking only her Irish Terrier Jack. She first visited Dalmatia, then Turkey and India. She was not permitted to enter China from Burma and instead arrived by sea, disembarking in Guangzhou. In China, she traveled by litter, by horse, and by foot. She passed through Tibet, sailed along the Yangtze, reached Hankou by train, and then arrived at the Gobi Desert. In Ulaanbaatar, she delivered a buggy ordered by a Mongolian prince from the United States which she had used on her voyage. Kendall then traveled to Lake Baikal. Taking the Trans-Siberian Railway from Irkutsk, she finally arrived in Liverpool, and returned to the United States. She recounted her experience in A Wayfarer in China: Impressions of a Trip Across West China and Mongolia. For her book and her travels, she was named Fellow of the Royal Geographical Society.

== Publications ==
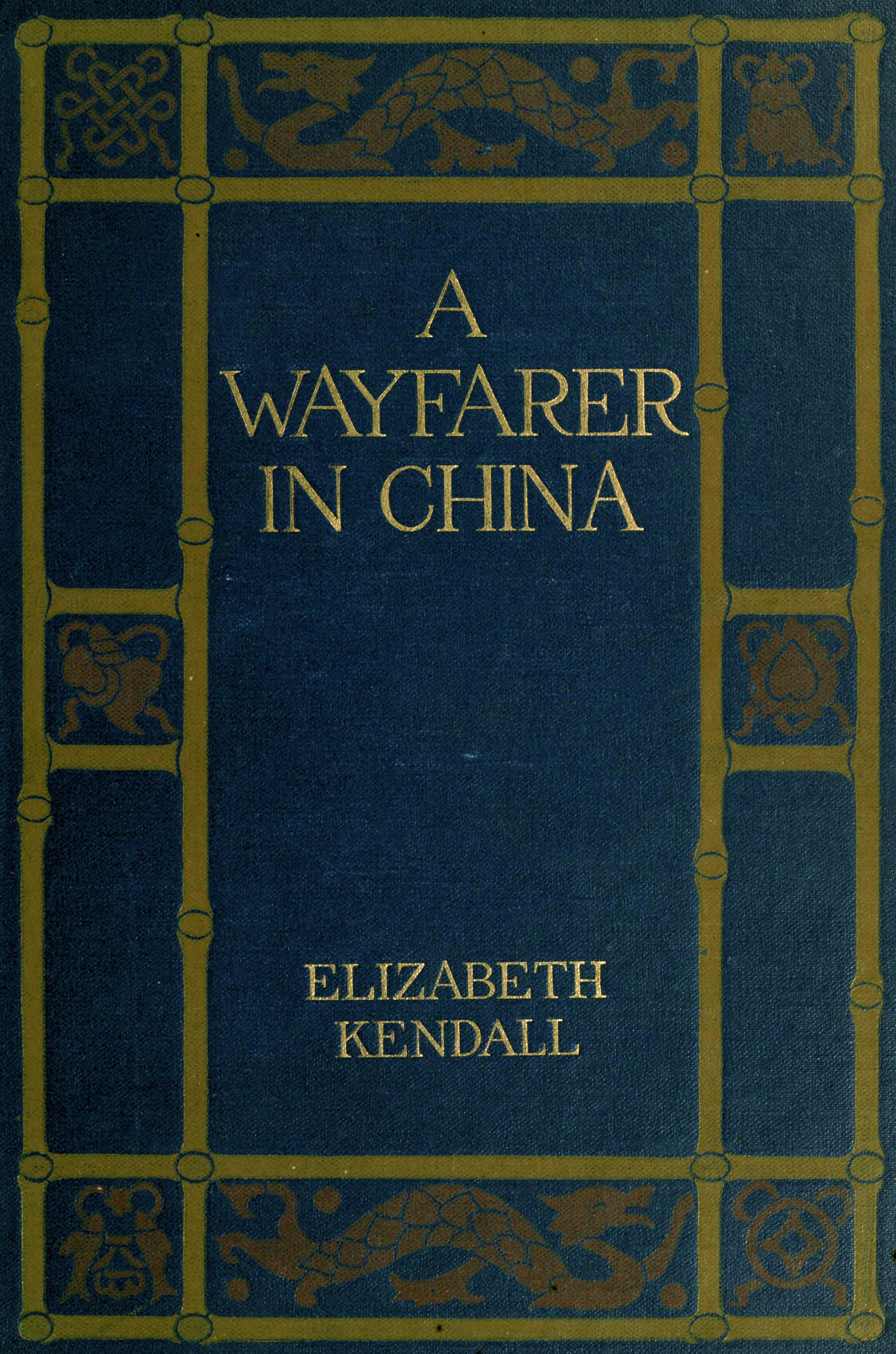
The cover of A Wayfarer in China

- Coman, Katharine; Kendall, Elizabeth Kimball (1894). The Growth of the English Nation. Meadville, Pennsylvania: Flood and Vincent.
- Coman, Katharine; Kendall, Elizabeth Kimball (1899). A History of England for High Schools and Academies. London: The Macmillan Company.
- Kendall, Elizabeth Kimball, ed. (1900). Source-Book of English History for the Use of Schools and Readers. New York: MacMillan.
- Coman, Katharine; Kendall, Elizabeth Kimball (1901). A Short History of England for School Use. New York: MacMillan.
- Kendall, Elizabeth Kimball (1913). A Wayfarer in China: Impressions of a Trip Across West China and Mongolia. Boston: Houghton Mifflin.

== Bibliography ==
- "As We See it". Pamona, California: Progress-Bulletin. 17 July 1934.
- Balderston, Katherine Canby; Glasscock, Jean (1975). Wellesley College, 1875-1975: A Century of Women. Wellesley College.
- Bates, Katharine Lee; Bean, Mary A.; McCaulley, Martha G. (July 1920). "A Tribute to Miss Kendall and Miss Chandler". Wellesley Alumnae Quarterly. 4 (4): 267–273.
- Burmester, Beth (2006). "Discovering the Legacy of Rhetoric in Nineteenth-Century Women's Colleges: Connecting Institutional and Individual Histories across Geographies". South Atlantic Review. 71 (4): 6–25.
- Cosner, Shaaron; Scanlon, Jennifer (1996). American Women Historians, 1700s–1990s: A Biographical Dictionary. Greenwood Publishing Group. pp. 44–45. ISBN 9780313296642.
- "Elizabeth Kendall: Professor of History at Wellesley 32 Years". The Boston Globe. Boston. 22 May 1952.
- "Early US students". St Anne's College.
- "History". Wellesley Alumnae Quarterly. 2 (3): 182–183. April 1918.
- "Irish Terrier Famous in All China". New York: New York Herald. 8 Jan 1922.
- Jardins, Julie Des (2004). Women and the Historical Enterprise in America: Gender, Race and the Politics of Memory. UNC Press. ISBN 9780807854754.
- Kendall, Elizabeth Kimball (1913). A Wayfarer in China: Impressions of a Trip Across West China and Mongolia. Boston: Houghton Mifflin.
- Kimball, G. F. (1902). The Kimball Family News. Topeka, Kansas: G.F. Kimball.
- Mann, William Justin (1 June 1922). "Little Walks About Boston". The Boston Post.
- Morrison, Leonard Allison; Sharples, Stephen Paschall (1897). The History of the Kimball family in America from 1634 to 1897, and of its ancestors the Kemballs or Kemboldes of England. Vol. 2. Boston: Damrell & Upham.
- "Mrs. L. H. Kendall Dies While Visiting in England". Washington Times. Washington, D.C. 23 March 1911 – via Newspapers.com.
- Palmieri, Patricia Ann (1997). In Adamless Eden: the Community of Women Faculty at Wellesley. Yale University Press. ISBN 9780300055290.
- Ping, Hao (2017). "Ascension of Yenching to a first-place University". In Ping, Hao (ed.). John Leighton Stuart's Missionary-Educator's Career in China. Routledge. pp. 102–132. ISBN 9781134878031.
- Vaughn, Gerald F. (2004). "Katharine Coman: America's First Woman Institutional Economist and a Champion of Education for Citizenship". Journal of Economic Issues. 38 (4): 989–1002. doi:10.1080/00213624.2004.11506753. ISSN 0021-3624. JSTOR 4228084.
- Ware, Susan (1989). Partner and I: Molly Dewson, feminism, and New Deal politics. Yale University Press.
- "Woman Crosses the China Wilds Alone: Boston Teacher Makes Journey on Foot Into Thibet and Thence to Hankow". Chicago: Chicago Examiner. 23 September 1911.
