= Ghar Ek Mandir =

Ghar Ek Mandir (lit. 'Home is a Temple') may refer to these in Indian entertainment:

- Ghar Ek Mandir (film), a 1984 Hindi-language Indian film
- Ghar Ek Mandir (TV series), an Indian television show

== See also ==
- GHAR (disambiguation)
- Mandira (disambiguation)
