= Boston marriage =

Cohabitation of two women, independent of financial support from a man

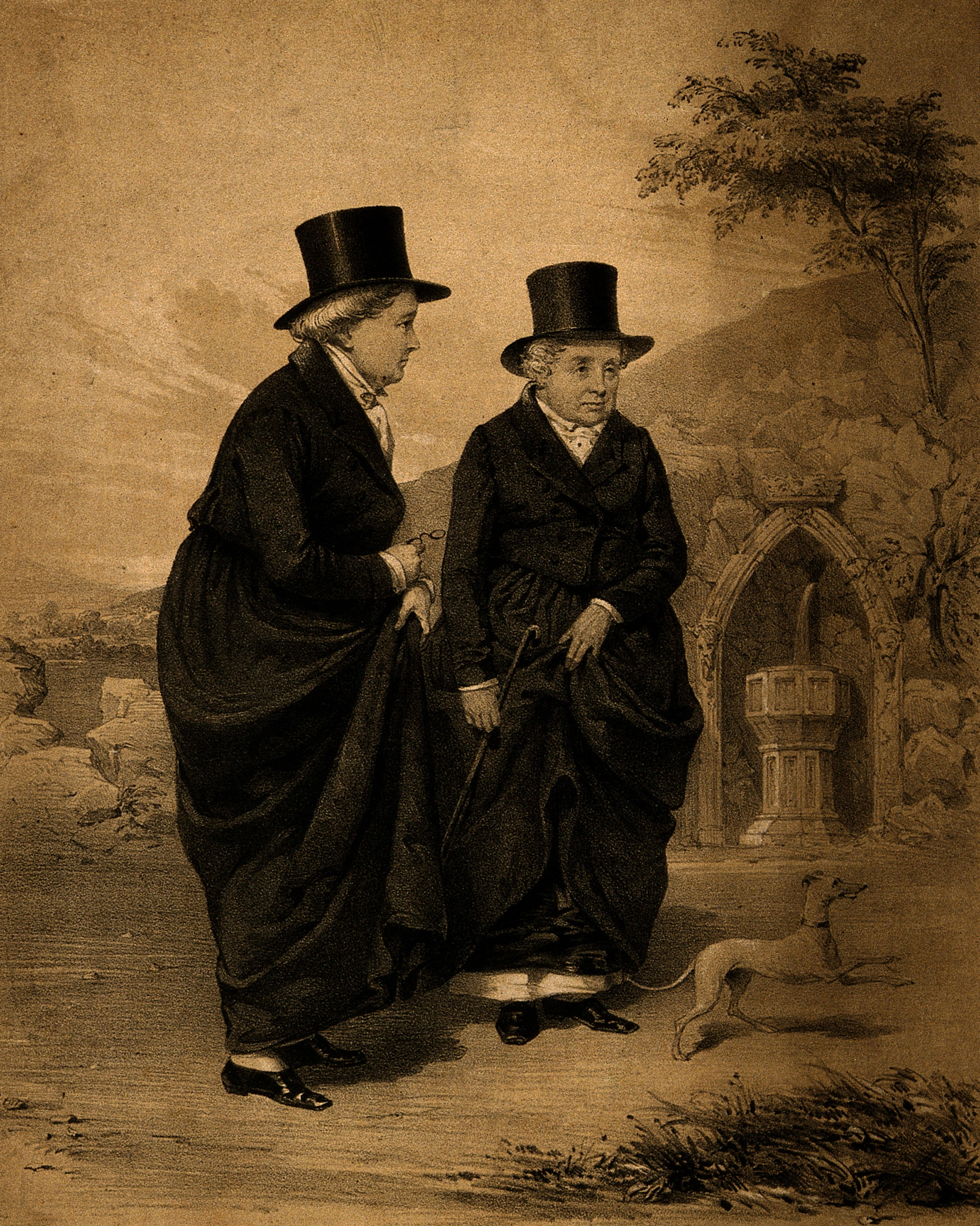
Sarah Ponsonby and Lady Eleanor Butler, also known as the Ladies of Llangollen, lived together in a Boston marriage.

A Boston marriage was, historically, the cohabitation of two women who were independent of financial support from a man. The term is said to have been in use in New England in the United States in the late 19th–early 20th century. Some of these relationships were romantic in nature; others were not.

== Etymology ==
The fact of relatively formalized romantic friendships or life partnerships between women predates the term Boston marriage and there is a long record of it in England and other European countries. The term derived from Henry James's The Bostonians (1886), a novel involving a long-term co-habiting relationship between two unmarried women, "new women", although James himself never used the term. James's sister Alice lived in such a relationship with Katherine Loring and was among his sources for the novel.

Some examples of women in Boston marriages were well known. In the late 1700s, for example, Anglo-Irish upper-class women Eleanor Butler and Sarah Ponsonby were identified as a couple and nicknamed the Ladies of Llangollen. Elizabeth Mavor suggests that the institution of romantic friendships between women reached a zenith in 18th-century England. In the U.S., a prominent example is that of novelist Sarah Orne Jewett and her companion Annie Adams Fields, widow of the editor of The Atlantic Monthly, during the late 1800s.

Lillian Faderman provided one of the most comprehensive studies of Boston marriages in Surpassing the Love of Men (1981). 20th-century film reviewers used the term to describe the Jewett-Fields relationship depicted in the 1998 documentary film Out of the Past. David Mamet's play Boston Marriage premiered in 2000 and helped popularize the term.

== Sociology ==
Some women in Boston marriages did so because they felt they had a better connection to women than to men. Some of these women lived together out of necessity; such women were generally financially independent due to family inheritance or career earnings. Women who chose to have a career (doctor, scientist, professor) created a new group of women, known as new women, who were not financially dependent upon men. Educated women with careers who wanted to live with other women were allowed a measure of social acceptance and freedom to arrange their own lives. They were usually feminists with shared values, involved in social and cultural causes. Such women were generally self-sufficient in their own lives, but gravitated to each other for support in an often disapproving, sexist, and sometimes hostile society.

Until the 1920s, these arrangements were widely regarded as natural and respectable. After the 1920s, women in such relationships were increasingly suspected of being in lesbian relationships, which were then still widely regarded as unnatural or unrespectable, leading fewer single women to choose to live together.

== Wellesley marriage ==
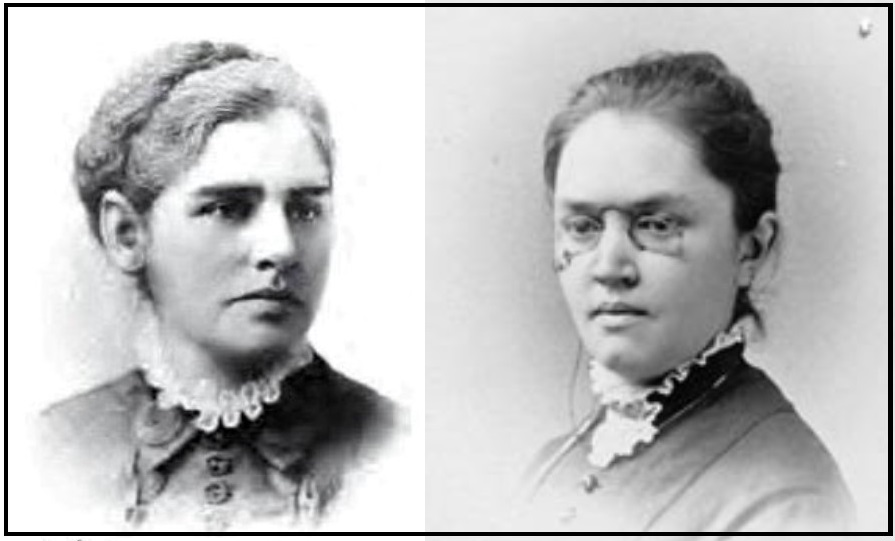
Katharine Coman and Katharine Lee Bates lived together in a Wellesley marriage for 25 years.

Boston marriages were so common at Wellesley College in Massachusetts, United States, during the late 19th and early 20th centuries that the term Wellesley marriage became a popular description. Typically, the relationship involved two academic women. This was common from about 1870 until 1920. Until the mid 20th century, women were expected to resign from their academic posts upon marriage; any woman who wanted to keep her academic career had to make housing arrangements other than a home with a husband and children, such as sharing a home with another like-minded single female professor. Additionally, as Lillian Faderman points out, college-educated women commonly found more independence, support, and like-mindedness by partnering with other women. Further, these alternative relationships freed women from the burdens of child-rearing, tending to husbands, and other domestic duties, thus allowing professional women such as college faculty to focus on their research.

There are many examples of Wellesley marriages in the historical record. Faderman documented that in the late 19th century, of the 53 female faculty at Wellesley, only one woman was conventionally married to a man; most of the others lived with a female companion. One of the most famous pairs were Katharine Lee Bates and Katharine Ellis Coman. Bates was a professor of poetry and the author of the words to "America the Beautiful", while Coman was an economic historian who is credited with writing the first industrial history of the US.

== See also ==
- Queerplatonic relationship – non-romantic intimate partnerships
- Romantic friendship – a close, non-sexual friendship
- Roommate
- Same-sex marriage in Massachusetts
- Womance
- Same-sex Marriage

== General and cited references ==
- Katherine B. Davis, Factors in the sex life of twenty-two hundred women (NY: Harper Brothers, 1929)
- Lillian Faderman, Odd Girls and Twilight Lovers: A History of Lesbian Life in Twentieth-Century America (Columbia University Press, 1991)
- Lillian Faderman, Surpassing the Love of Men: Romantic Friendship and Love Between Women from the Renaissance to the Present (NY: Morrow, 1981)
- Carol Brooks Gardner, "Boston marriages", in Jodi O'Brien, ed., Encyclopedia of Gender and Society, vol. 1 (SAGE Publications, 2009), pp. 87–88, available online (mistakenly says Henry James used the term)
- Rita K. Gollin, Annie Adams Fields: Woman of Letters (University of Massachusetts, Amherst, 2011)
- Elizabeth Mavor, The Ladies of Llangollen: A Study of Romantic Friendship (London: Penguin, 1971)
- Esther D. Rothblum and Kathleen A. Brehony, eds., Boston Marriages: Romantic but Asexual Relationships Among Contemporary Lesbians (University of Massachusetts Press, 1993)
- Carroll Smith-Rosenberg, Disorderly Conduct: Visions of Gender in Victorian America (Oxford University Press, 1986)
