= Katharine Coman =

American economist and activist (1857-1915)

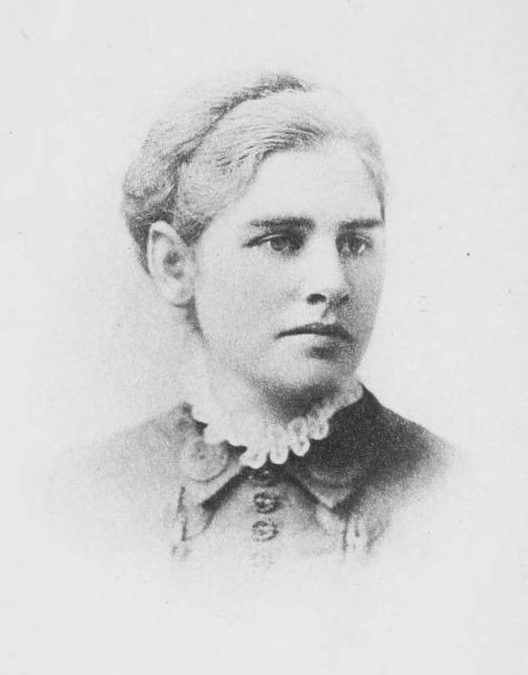
- Born: November 23, 1857; Newark, Ohio, U.S.
- Died: January 11, 1915 (aged 57); Wellesley, Massachusetts, U.S.
- Education: University of Michigan
- Occupation: Professor
- Partner: Katharine Lee Bates

Katharine Ellis Coman (November 23, 1857 – January 11, 1915) was an American social activist and professor. She was based at the women-only Wellesley College, Massachusetts, where she created new courses in political economy, in line with her personal belief in social change. As dean, she established a new department of economics and sociology.

Among other admired works, Coman wrote The Industrial History of the United States and Economic Beginnings of the Far West: How We Won the Land Beyond the Mississippi. She was the first female statistics professor in the US, the only woman co-founder of the American Economics Association, and author of the first paper published in The American Economic Review. A believer in trades unionism, social insurance and the settlement movement, Coman travelled widely to conduct her research, and took her students on field trips to factories and tenements. She shared a home with poet Katharine Lee Bates.

== Early life ==
Coman was born in 1857 to Martha Ann Seymour Coman (1826–1911) and Levi Parsons Coman (1826–1889) in Newark, Ohio. Her mother had graduated from an Ohio female seminary, and her father had been educated at Hamilton College, and thus Coman received much of her early education at home. She attended the University of Michigan for two years, left college to teach in Ottawa, Illinois for two years, and then returned to university. She earned a Bachelor of Philosophy (PhB) degree in 1880, one of only a handful of women to do so. She was influenced by the work of John Stuart Mill, which is evident in her later work as economist and historian. Coman attended lectures about socialism while traveling in London. Later in her career, she was influenced by Alfred Marshall (1890), Francis Amasa Walker (1883), and social Darwinism. While at the University of Michigan, Coman studied under Professors Charles Kendall Adams of the German Historical School; James Burrill Angell, then president of the university; and Henry Carter Adams, a renowned statistician.

== Wellesley College ==
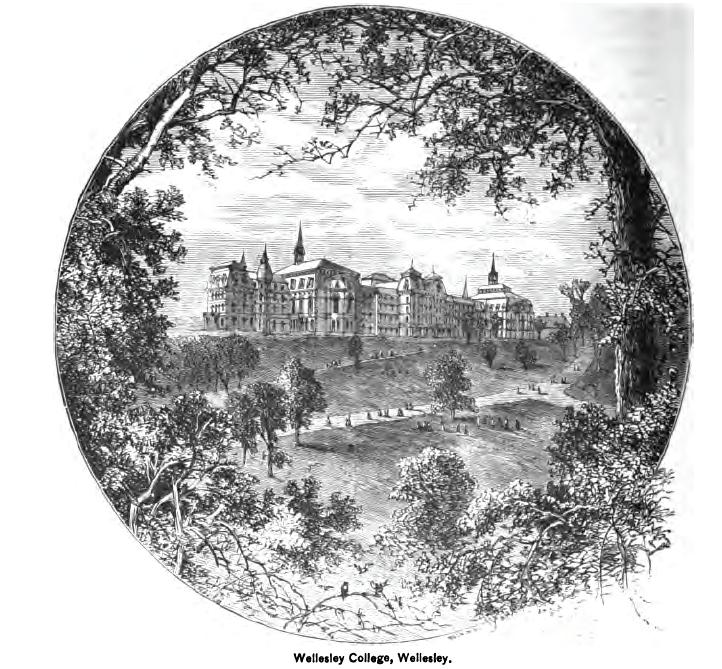
Etching of Wellesley College circa 1881

After earning her PhB, she joined the faculty at Wellesley College, a newly established private college for women in Wellesley, Massachusetts. Angell recommended her for the position, noting her talent for teaching. She first taught English rhetoric, and in 1881 became an instructor in history. In 1883, she was promoted to full professor of history. Because Coman believed that economics could address social problems, she urged the Wellesley administration to offer courses on the subject, and in 1883, she taught the college's first political economy class. Coman was the first American woman to teach statistics and Wellesley became the only American women's college to offer statistics courses before 1900.

Coman developed and taught several new courses in economics, history, and rhetoric, including Statistical Study of Economic Problems, Industrial History of the United States, and Conservation of Our Natural Resources, all framed by sociological insights related to social justice. To teach students about the practicality of applying economic theory to real world economic and social problems, Coman escorted her students on field trips to Boston's tenement houses, labor union meetings, factories, and sweatshops. In 1885, at the age of 28, she became professor of history and economics. That same year, she turned down the offer of a position as dean of women at the University of Michigan, stating that she preferred to remain at Wellesley and continue teaching. She was acting dean from 1899 to 1900, during which time she established a new department of economics and sociology, becoming its head in 1900.

According to historian Melinda Ponder, Coman was a popular teacher. Two of her students, Helen Frances Page Bates and Helen Laura Sumner Woodbury, were among the first American women to earn PhDs in economics. Woodbury is recognized as an important historian of labor and a noted economist, while Helen Bates became a noted social worker.

She retired from full-time teaching at Wellesley in 1913, becoming professor emeritus. In writing about the farewell dinner held in her honor, the New York Times said: "Miss Coman has been so closely associated with the history and development of Wellesley for so long a time that her loss is felt very deeply by the whole college." Coman continued to research and write until her death in 1915.

Coman's papers are held by the Wellesley College Archives. In 1921, the college established the Katharine Coman Professorship of Industrial History to honor her service.

== Notable works ==
Coman and Elizabeth Kendall coauthored the 1902 book A Short History of England for School Use based on research that Coman conducted in England between 1886 and 1894. Coman published The Industrial History of the United States in 1910, the first industrial history of the United States. It was reprinted nine times before 1915. Her 1911 article, "Some Unsettled Problems of Irrigation," was the first article published in the newly formed journal The American Economic Review.

Her 1912 work Economic Beginnings of the Far West: How We Won the Land Beyond the Mississippi was considered by contemporaneous scholars to be her magnum opus, (Note: According to Katharine Lee Bates, the book "best expresses [Coman's] vigorous and adventurous personality.) and "one of the most important fruits of the Carnegie Foundation for the Advancement of Teaching." The book outlined the economic history of the American West. (Note: It included chapters on the early Spanish explorers, Spanish missions in California, Santa Fe trade, the Russian exploration of the Pacific Northwest, the beaver fur trade, the Mexican–American War and subsequent cession of what became the American Southwest, the Mormon migration to Utah, early explorers of the West, and the creation of the states of Kansas and Oregon.)

In this work, Coman describes the historical economic processes that led to the Far West coming under the control of settlers. She found that settlers were more economically successful than explorers, traders, trappers, and indigenous peoples because the settlers built permanent settlements, reproduced at a higher rate, and established networks of collaboration.

Settlement movement activist Jane Addams, a close friend, urged Coman to research social insurance programs in Europe in order to establish similar programs in the United States. Coman studied social insurance in England, Spain, Denmark, and Sweden, but poor health prevented her from continuing her research. Her manuscript, "Unemployment Insurance: A Summary of European Systems" was published after her death in 1915. (Note: Coman's notes from the study of old age pensions and unemployment social insurance in Europe are housed at Wellesley in the Katharine Coman Papers Collection.)

== Social activism ==
Coman was passionate about social and economic issues, especially women's education, poverty, immigration, and labor. Throughout her life, she was active in social reform movements, especially the labor movement and the settlement movement. She served as the president of the electoral board and chair of the standing committee of the National College Settlements Association in 1900. Coman organized a group of immigrant women who worked in Boston sweatshops, naming the group an "Evening Club for Tailoresses," and attempted to found a tailor shop that could have been an alternative to sweatshops. She assisted in organizing the 1910 Chicago garment workers' strike, which involved 40,000 factory workers. Coman also worked with the Women's Trade Union League. Working with her economist and sociologist friend Emily Greene Balch and other women, Coman co-founded Denison House in 1892, a college women's settlement house located in Boston, serving as its first chair. Denison House provided a center for Boston's labor activists, and is thought to be the first settlement house on the East Coast.

== Personal life ==
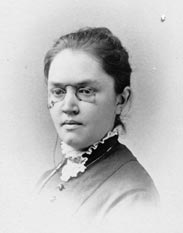
Katharine Lee Bates, author of the words to "America the Beautiful"

For 25 years, Coman lived in a "Boston marriage" with Wellesley professor and poet Katharine Lee Bates, the author of "America the Beautiful". Such partnerships were so common among Wellesley faculty that they were called "Wellesley marriages". Coman and Bates shared a house they named "the Scarab" with Bates' mother, Cornelia, and her sister, Jeannie. The women reportedly enjoyed life together as family. Coman frequently traveled for her research on economic history; she visited Europe, the American West, Scandinavia, and Egypt. Bates accompanied her on many of these trips. Some scholars believe the two women were a lesbian couple. (Note: Writing in 1952, Burgess wrote that Coman was Bates' "dearest companion of her life.")

== Breast cancer and death ==
Coman first discovered a lump in her left breast in the fall of 1911 and underwent two surgeries in the following months. At the time, medical doctors did not understand the nature of breast cancer, its causes or its treatments, so the prognosis for Coman was poor. Coman died at home in January 1915 at the age of 58. At the time of her death, Coman had been working on an industrial history of New England.

During Coman's illness, friends of her and Bates — many of them also in "Wellesley marriages" — took Coman out for walks and visits, and invited her to stay at their country homes. They prepared meals for Coman and Bates, brought flowers and fresh vegetables, and performed tasks and services to keep Coman's spirits up. Bates chronicled Coman's illness in her diary, noting hospital visits, surgical procedures, and details about Coman's pain and suffering. According to cancer historian Ellen Leopold, in the days after Coman's death, Bates wrote a memorial to her that was designed to be circulated privately among the women's close friends and family. Leopold believes that the book, For Katharine Coman's Family and Innermost Circle of Friends, is the first breast cancer narrative in American literature. Near the end of Coman's life, the two women exchanged loving farewells through reciting poems and psalms to each other. Several years after Coman's death, Bates continued to mourn and to recall Coman's suffering. In 1922, Bates published a book of poems about Coman's illness, Yellow Clover: A Book of Remembrance. (Note: In the poem, "In Cedar Hill Cemetery (Newark, Ohio)," Bates writes: O ashes, memory of moral love, Sealed in your urn beneath the greensward, pure From evil, what am I to weep above Your beautiful and tranquil sepulture?) The book's title emerged from the fact that the "two Katharines," as the women were known, would send each other sprigs of yellow clover as tokens of affection.

== Assessment ==
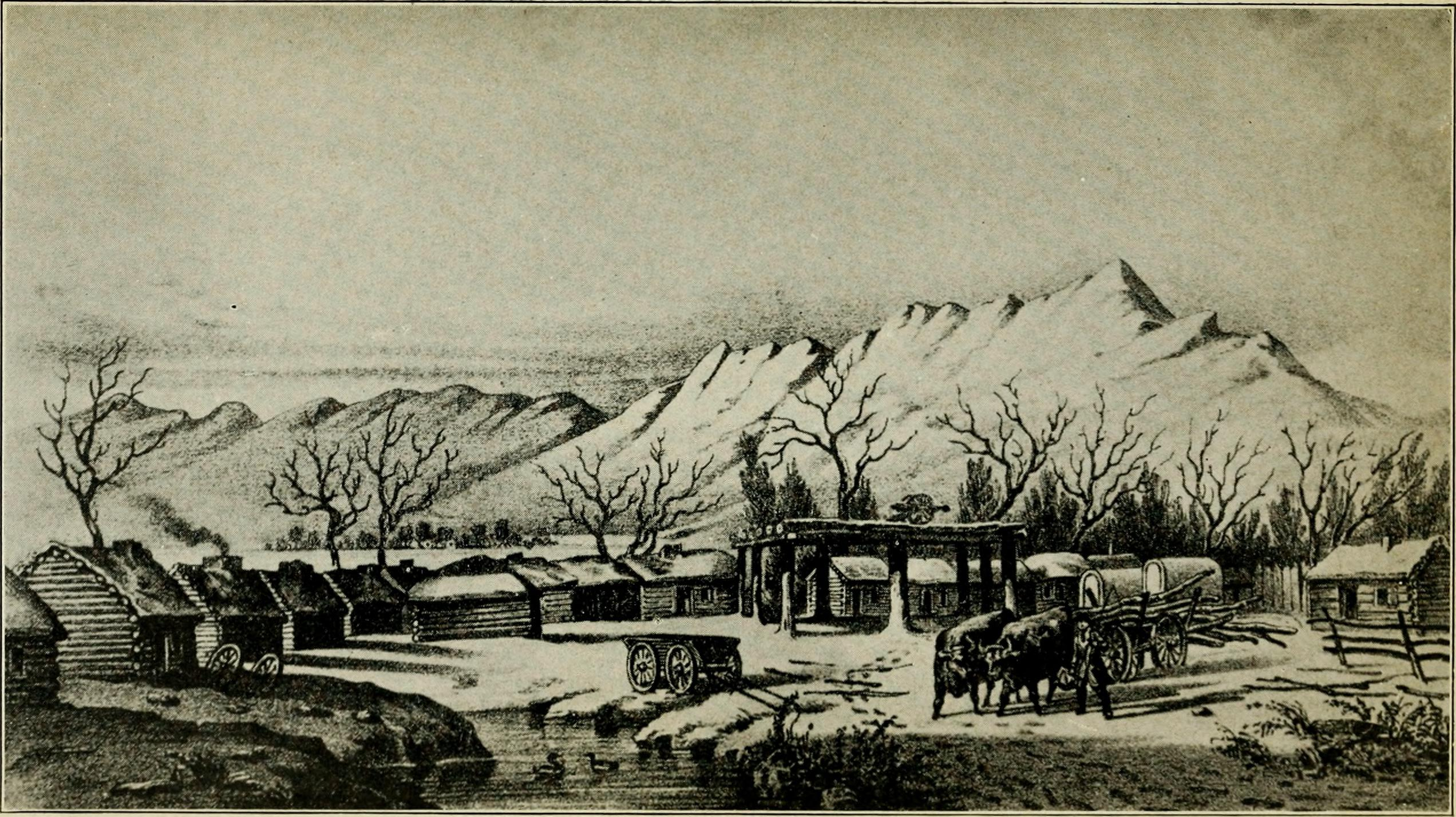

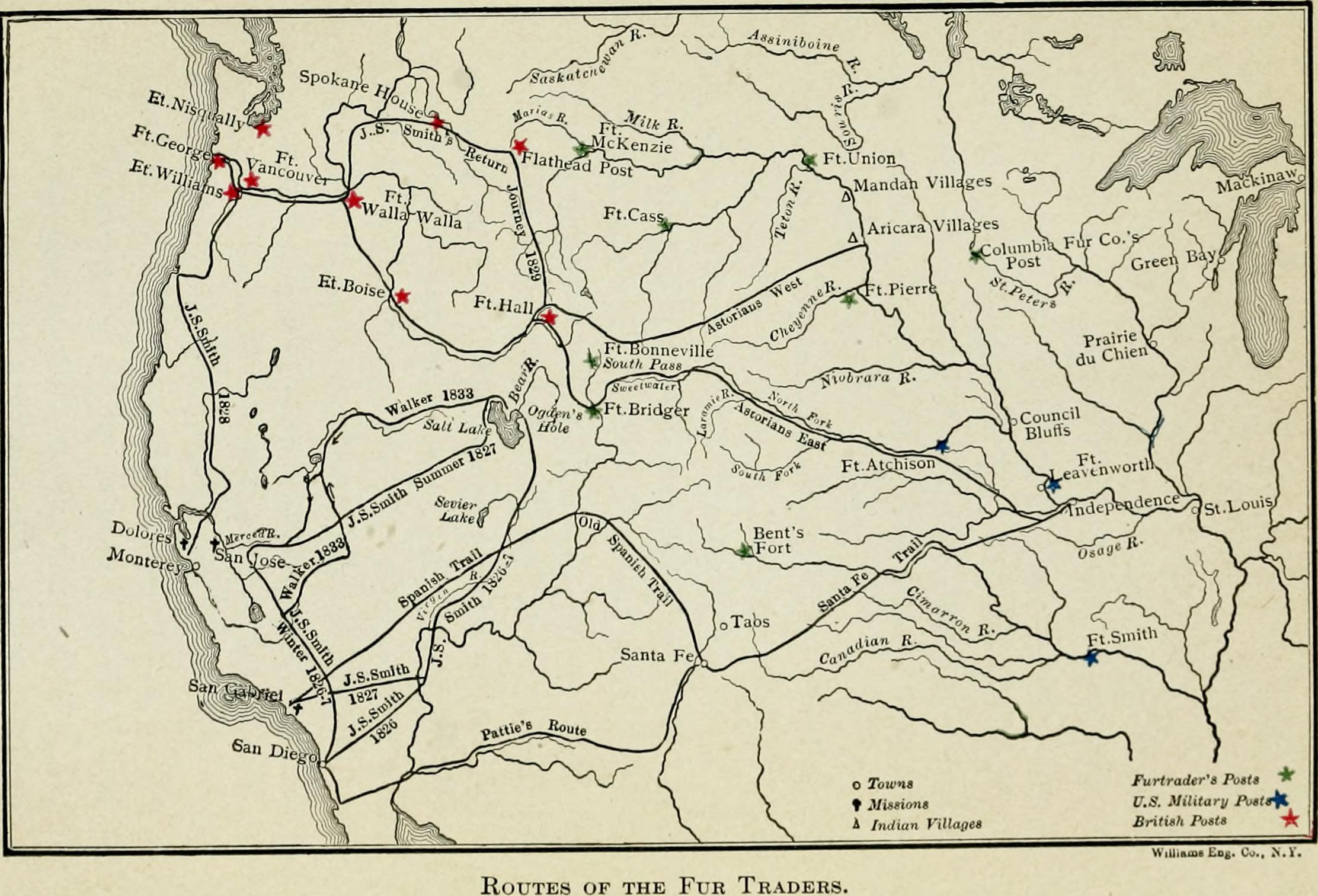
Illustrations from Coman's 1912 book, Economic Beginnings of the Far West: How We Won the Land Beyond the Mississippi.

A review of Coman's book Economic Beginnings of the Far West: How We Won the Land Beyond the Mississippi (1912) in the San Francisco Chronicle stated that "the author is one of those new women who have shown what may be accomplished in the way of research by method and industry and a great deal of enthusiasm." In a 1913 review of her book, economist Thomas Nixon Carver praised Coman's narrative style and lively prose. Also writing in 1913, economist Frederic Paxson criticized the book, arguing that there were factual errors and inaccurate citations, and that the data for the book were already widely available in university research libraries. Paxson does credit Coman with having prepared an extensive bibliography and for providing extensive notes. The two-volume book is today hailed as a classic and was reprinted twice; Macmillan in 1925, and Kelly in 1969. The University of Michigan "Naming Project" notes that she was one of the first historians to use local newspaper articles and government documents as primary sources in her teaching and writing.

Gerald F. Vaughn, a contemporary economist writing in 2004, proposes that Coman was America's first female institutional economist. Vaughn notes other important facts about Coman that frame her as a pioneer for women academics, including the fact that at the time, the discipline and profession of economics was dominated by men. She was the only woman among the group of economists who founded the American Economic Association in 1885 and she was the first American woman to become a statistics professor. Vaughn notes that her contributions to economics and social history went beyond being the "first woman," for example writing the first article to be published in The American Economic Review and authoring the first industrial history of the US. Coman's extensive work on the processes of institutional change in the American West made her an influential industrial historian and The Industrial History of the United States was widely used as a textbook for decades.

In 2011, The American Economic Review commemorated its first hundred years by publishing a list of the top twenty articles in the journal's history. Coman's 1911 article "Some Unsettled Problems of Irrigation," published in 1911, was the first article published by the journal and was reprinted in the 2011 issue. The article analyzed water rights, access, and availability. Also in this issue of The American Economic Review, economist Gary D. Libecap noted that Coman's work continued to be relevant, particularly for scholars interested in the economics of climate change. Elinor Ostrom, an American political economist, believes that Coman's article continues to provide "insight into the problems of collective action related to irrigation in the American West."

== Selected publications ==
=== Books ===
- Coman, Katharine; Kendall, Elizabeth Kimball (1894). The Growth of the English Nation. Meadville, Pennsylvania: Flood and Vincent.
- Coman, Katharine; Kendall, Elizabeth Kimball (1899). A History of England for High Schools and Academies. London: The Macmillan Company.
- Bates, Katharine Lee; Coman, Katharine, eds. (1902). English History Told by English Poets: A Reader for School Use. New York: The Macmillan Company. (reprinted 1908, 1911, 1914)
- Coman, Katharine (1905). The Industrial History of the United States. New York: The Macmillan Company. (reprinted in 1906, 1907, 1908; revised 1910; reprinted 1912, 1918, 1973)
- Coman, Katharine (1912). Economic Beginnings of the Far West: How We Won the Land Beyond the Mississippi. New York: The Macmillan Company. (reprinted 1925; 1969)

=== Articles ===
- Coman, Katharine (1891). "The Tailoring Trade and the Sweating System". Publications of the American Economic Association. 6 (1/2): 144–147. JSTOR 2560467.
- Coman, Katharine (1893). "Wages and Prices in England, 1261–1701". Journal of Political Economy. 2 (1): 92–94. doi:10.1086/250188. JSTOR 1819834. S2CID 153414904.
- Coman, Katharine (1903). "The History of Contract Labor in the Hawaiian Islands". Publications of the American Economic Association. 4 (3): 1–61. JSTOR 2485748.
- Coman, Katharine (1904). "The Negro as a Peasant Farmer". Publications of the American Statistical Association. 9 (66): 39–54. doi:10.2307/2276298. JSTOR 2276298. S2CID 152426897.
- Coman, Katharine; Bogart, Ernest L.; Ely, Richard T.; Gay, Edwin F. (1907). "Stages of Economic Development.-Discussion". Publications of the American Economic Association. 8 (1): 127–136. JSTOR 2999900.
- Coman, Katharine. (1911). "Some Unsettled Problems of Irrigation." The American Economic Review 1(1): 1–19. Reprinted in 2011 as The American Economic Review 101: 36–48.
