= Jamai Raja =

Jamai Raja (lit. 'son-in-law' in Indic languages) may refer to these Indian media:

- Jamai Raja (film), a 1990 Bollywood film
- Jamai Raja (2014 TV series), an Indian Hindi-language soap opera
- Jamai Raja (2017 TV series), an Indian Bengali-language soap opera
- Mappillai (2011 film), a 2011 Indian Tamil-language film, released in Hindi as Jamai Raja

== See also ==
- Jamai (disambiguation)
- Raja (disambiguation)
- Ghar Jamai (disambiguation)
