= Emotional affair =

Certain type of relationship

An emotional affair is a type of relationship, often a bond between two people that mimics or matches the closeness and emotional intimacy of a romantic relationship while not being physically consummated. An emotional affair is sometimes referred to as an affair of the heart. An emotional affair may emerge from a friendship and progress toward greater levels of personal intimacy and attachment.

== Definition ==
An emotional affair can be defined as:

"A relationship between a person and someone other than (their) spouse that affects the level of intimacy, emotional distance and overall dynamic balance in the marriage. The role of an affair is to create emotional distance in the marriage."

In this view, neither sexual intercourse nor physical affection is necessary to affect the committed relationship(s) of those involved in the affair. It is theorized that an emotional affair can injure a committed relationship more than a one night stand or other casual sexual encounters. Some people do not consider non-physical intimacy to be cheating, a view more prevalent among men. Actions seen as innocent by some people may be seen as a betrayal by others, and people may engage in behavior that they only identify as inappropriate retroactively.

== Incidence and prevalence ==
Research by Glass & Wright found that men's extramarital relationships were more sexual and women's more emotional. For both genders, sexual and emotional extramarital involvement occurred in those with the greatest marital dissatisfaction.

Chaste and emotionally intimate affairs tend to be more common than sexually intimate affairs. Shirley Glass reported in Not "Just Friends" that, among those who claim to have had an affair, 44% of husbands and 57% of wives indicated they had a strong emotional involvement with the subject of the affair without intercourse.

In University of Chicago surveys conducted by the National Opinion Research Center (NORC) between 1990 and 2002, 27% of people who reported being happy in marriage admitted to having an extramarital affair. The meaning and definition of what infidelity constitutes often varies depending on the person asked. Sexual feelings in an emotional affair may be denied to maintain the illusion that it is just a special friendship. Affair surveys are unlikely to explore what is denied. Many people in affair surveys are not honest with themselves nor with the interviewer. Along with the possibility of these phenomena being underrepresented, this raises the possibility that it is being overrepresented, and the actual prevalence may be lower than indicated.

== Therapy as subset ==
The entrance of a therapist into a couple's dynamics may be problematic. It may be experienced by the non-client partner as the client having an emotional affair with the therapist if the client is perceived as granting the therapist a greater degree of intimacy and confiding than they grant the client's partner. The tendency to create a mate-substitute out of the therapist may be especially acute in incest survivors.

== See also ==
- Marriage of convenience
- Open relationship
- Polyamory
- Platonic love
- Romantic friendship
- Sexless marriage
- Spiritual marriage
- Work spouse
