= Ghar Jamai =

Ghar Jamai may refer to:

- Gharjamai, refers to a live-in son-in-law
- Ghar Jamai (1992 film), a 1992 Indian Hindi-language film
- Gharjamai (2008 film), a 2008 Indian Bengali-language film
- Ghar Jamai (TV series), an Indian comedy television series

== See also ==
- Ghar (disambiguation)
- Jamai (disambiguation)
- Jamai Raja (disambiguation)
- House Husband (disambiguation)
