= Hamara Ghar =

Hamara Ghar (lit. 'Our Home' in Hindi) may refer to these Indian films:

- Hamara Ghar (1964 film), a social drama film
- Hamara Ghar (1950 film), a family drama film

== See also ==
- Our Home (disambiguation)
- GHAR (disambiguation)
