= Helen Sumner Woodbury =

American economist, academic, historian and public official

Helen Laura Sumner
- Born: March 12, 1876; Sheboygan, Wisconsin
- Died: March 10, 1933 (aged 56); New York City
- Education: Wellesley College and University of Wisconsin
- Occupation: Economist
- Employer(s): U.S. Children's Bureau and Institute of Economics
- Partner: Robert Morse Woodbury

Helen Laura Sumner Woodbury (March 12, 1876 – March 10, 1933) was an American economist, academic, historian and public official.

== Biography ==
Woodbury was born Helen Laura Sumner on 12 March 1876 to the district attorney and later Colorado judge George True Sumner and Katherine Eudora Marsh in Sheboygan, Wisconsin. Woodbury attended Wellesley College where she got her undergraduate degree in 1898 before going on to be one of the first women to earn a PhD in economics, from the University of Wisconsin–Madison in 1908 with her thesis, "The Labor Movement in America, 1827–1837"

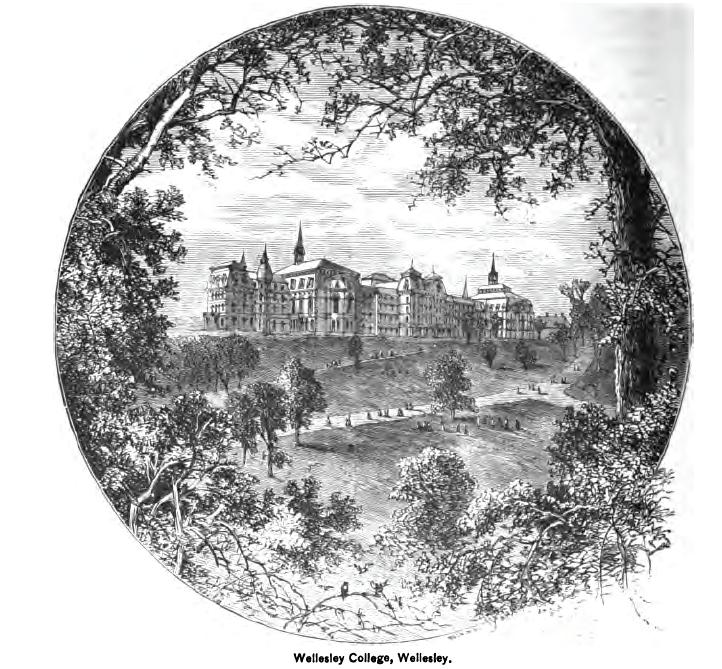
Etching of Wellesley College circa 1881

Woodbury was influenced by her professors, including Katharine Coman and Emily Greene Balch in her undergraduate years as well as Richard T. Ely and John Commons in her postgraduate career. She focused on labour economics and suffrage. She published her 2-year investigation into women's suffrage in Colorado as "Equal Suffrage" in 1909 as well as working on Commons' "Trade Unionism and Labor Problems" and for his American Bureau of Industrial Research. Woodbury was also associate editor on Commons' "A Documentary History of American Industrial Society". Her work and investigations into suffrage was the core of the U.S. Bureau of Labor Statistics' "History of Women in Industry in the United States".

Woodbury published regularly for the U.S. Bureau of Labor Statistics and travelled Europe looking at the labour laws and how they might apply in the US before she became a full-time staff member of the U.S. Children's Bureau in 1913. In 1918 Woodbury was promoted to director of investigations for the bureau. She resigned from that position when she married fellow economist Robert Morse Woodbury but went on to work for the Institute of Economics in 1924. Woodbury created standards for gathering labour statistics as well as contributing to the Encyclopedia of the Social Sciences and the Dictionary of American Biography.

Woodbury died in 1933 in New York City.

== Bibliography ==
- 'The Cross of Gold'- short story (1896)
- Industrial Courts in France, Germany, and Switzerland (1910)
- Child Labor Legislation in the United States (1915)
- The Working Children of Boston: A Study of Child Labor under a Modern System of Legal Regulation (1922)
