= Ghar Ki Izzat =

Ghar Ki Izzat (lit. 'The Honour of the House') may refer to these Indian films:

- Ghar Ki Izzat (1948 film), a 1948 Hindi social family drama film
- Ghar Ki Izzat (1994 film), a 1994 Bollywood drama film

== See also ==
- GHAR (disambiguation)
- Izzat (disambiguation)
