= Jamai =

Jamai may refer to:

== Places ==
- Jamai, India, a municipality in Chhindwara district in the Indian state of Madhya Pradesh

== Persons ==
Given name

- Jamai Loman, Dutch pop singer better known by his mononym Jamai and winner of Dutch Idol in 2003, the inaugural season in the Netherlands

Family name

- Aboubakr Jamaï (born 1968) also known as Boubker, Moroccan journalist, banker and publisher

== Others ==
- Jamai Raja (disambiguation)
  - Jamai Raja, 1990 Hindi comedy drama film
- Jamai Shashthi, 1931 Bengali film directed by Amar Choudhury
- Adorer jamai, 2011 Bengali action comedy film
- Ghar Jamai (disambiguation)
