= Our Home =

Our Home may refer to:

- Our Home (store), a Filipino retailing chain
- "Our Home", a song by Brett Kissel from the 2023 album The Compass Project
- Nosso Lar (Portuguese for "Our Home"), a best-selling novel by the Brazilian spiritist medium Francisco Cândido Xavier
  - Nosso Lar (film), a 2010 Brazilian drama film based on the book
- Meie Kodu (Estonian for "Our Home"), a weekly Estonian language newspaper published in Sydney, New South Wales, Australia, between 1949 and 1954

Political parties

- Yisrael Beiteinu, a nationalist political party in Israel
- Our Home – Russia (NDP), a Russian political party between 1995 and early 2000
- Ukraine is Our Home, a Ukrainian political party

== See also ==
- Hamara Ghar (disambiguation)
