= Emotional intimacy =

Emotional aspects of an intimate relationship

Emotional intimacy is an aspect of interpersonal relationships characterized by a shared sense of closeness, trust, and mutual understanding. It involves the expression and validation of personal feelings, thoughts, and experiences to another, and varies across relationships and time, similar to physical intimacy.

== Description ==
Emotional intimacy can be expressed in verbal and non-verbal communication. The degree of comfort, effectiveness, and mutual experience of closeness is often used to evaluate its presence in relationships. Intimate communication may be conveyed through both verbal exchanges and nonverbal behaviors, such as physical proximity or affectionate gestures.

Emotional intimacy depends on the degree of interpersonal closeness, the nature of the relationship, and the cultural context in which it occurs. Emotional intimacy is different from sexual intimacy in that sexual intimacy can take place with or without emotional closeness, and emotional intimacy does not require a sexual component. Emotional intimacy is a psychological event in which trust, mutual responsiveness, and open communication between two people enable partners to share personal thoughts and feelings. Such intimacy might involve partners reaching an understanding, offering mutual support, or building a sense of community.

The development of emotional intimacy derives from transactions of self-disclosure, empathetic understanding, and perceived partner responsiveness. Deep or sustained intimacy generally requires openness and a willingness to be vulnerable, including the discussion of both positive and negative personal characteristics. Studies have found that communication quality is a central predictor of emotional closeness across relationships, including long-distance partnerships, which can be a much more challenging situation because of restricted communication. Such relationships often rely heavily on verbal and written communication to maintain intimacy. There is often a need for personal bonding in long-distance relationships since separation leads to reduced interdependence and greater uncertainty about the future of the relationship, both of which complicate relationship maintenance.

== History and development ==
The modern concept of emotional intimacy was introduced from research in attachment theory during the mid-20th century. Early psychiatric theorists such as John Bowlby argued that infants need to create intimate emotional bonds with at least one caregiver in order to form the foundation for emotional functioning, interpersonal closeness, and intimacy. In addition to the theory, Mary Ainsworth’s observational work demonstrated that securely attached children develop stronger emotional communication skills and expectations of reliable, responsive relationships.

In the 1940s, Carl Rogers introduced Person‑Centered Therapy or “Rogerian Therapy”, emphasizing reflective listening, empathy, and acceptance. These ideas are core principles of intimate emotional relationships, influencing clinical and relational research by shifting the understanding of intimacy from a purely emotional bond to a process of openness, responsiveness, and mutual validation.

During the 1970s and 1980s, the social penetration theory was developed to explain the relationship between self-disclosure and closeness. Altman and Taylor's social penetration theory proposed that the process of bonding that deepens a relationship more intimately is specifically accomplished through self-disclosure. Social penetration can occur platonically (for example, friendships or social groups) or in a romantic relationship.

== Emotional Intimacy Scale ==
The 5-item Emotional Intimacy Scale (EIS) is a scale which enables an evaluation of the emotional intimacy in a relationship. Its goal is to predict the different outcomes produced by the existence of an intimate relationship.

This scale is created with a study of different items which are fundamental components of an intimate relationship. Some persons need to answer to a questionnaire. They answer to judge the degree of truth of each of these components in comparison with their actual situation. There are five of them:

- This person completely accepts me as I am
- I can openly share my deepest thoughts and feelings with this person
- This person cares deeply for me
- This person would willingly help me in any way
- My thoughts and feelings are understood and affirmed by this person

These results are putting in correlation with specific values which characterize an individual such as psychological and physical well-being, social support, and health.

The results provided by the scale prove a positive relationship between an increase of EIS and an increase for the individual of social support, self-efficiency, life satisfaction and other positive effects. It also shows the negative relation between a decrease of EIS and an increase of stress, pain, and fatigue for the individual. An intimate relationship gives a sentiment of purpose and belonging which increases physiological and psychological well-being.

== See also ==
- Acceptance
- Attachment theory
- Compassion
- Emotional affair
- Emotional intelligence
- Empathy
- Love
- Physical intimacy
- Sympathy
