= Male romantic friendship =

Intimate relations between men

Male romantic friendship refers to the intimate relationship established between young men. This phenomenon is especially typical in the 19th century. Such relationships have some of the characteristics of romantic love relationships. This kind of interaction usually includes revealing inner emotions, mutual trust, and confiding in personal thoughts.

Records left over from history record a large number of emotional words in letters and diaries in men's romantic friendships, and also include forms of physical contact such as kissing. In response to these behaviours, the academic community has derived a variety of different interpretations of whether such relationships have sexual or romantic attributes.

== Development ==
Male romantic friendships between young men mostly sprout in the transition stage of adolescence to adulthood. During this period, some middle-class men left their hometowns and went to colleges and universities to study or go out to work. A new social environment was formed, and deep and intimate friendships were born. The first-hand records at that time showed that this kind of friendship had common hobbies, emotional support and intimate physical interaction. Some of these friendships can still be continued after graduation.

== Comparison of female and male romantic friendships ==
Authors claim that this kind of friendship is similar to the same-sex friendship between women described in The Female World of Love and Ritual. For instance, Rotundo argues that male romantic friendship, like same-sex female friendship, was socially accepted, compatible with heterosexual marriage, and valued. On the other hand, men's and women's friendships differ in duration. Smith-Rosenberg says that female romantic friendships were generally formed in adolescence and continue during the rest of their life. Nevertheless, male romantic friendship usually lasted only during youthhood.

== Sexual activity ==
The intense manner that young men addressed each other in their letters makes some readers question if sexual activity was present in Romantic Friendships. In these correspondences, men talked about embracing each other, sleeping together, and the happiness generated by receiving a letter from their friends. These passages may suggest that these relations were more than friendships. Nevertheless, behaviors of that era explain some of the actions described that seemed peculiar for present-day people. For instance, in the 1800s, it was common for middle-class men to share a bed, and physical contact in these circumstances was inevitable. Moreover, the lack of heating made body contact a source of warmth that could be considered a pleasure. So, the fact that two men slept together did not necessarily mean that they had sexual relations.
