= Katharine Lee Bates =

American poet, author, and professor; writer of "America the Beautiful" (1859–1929)

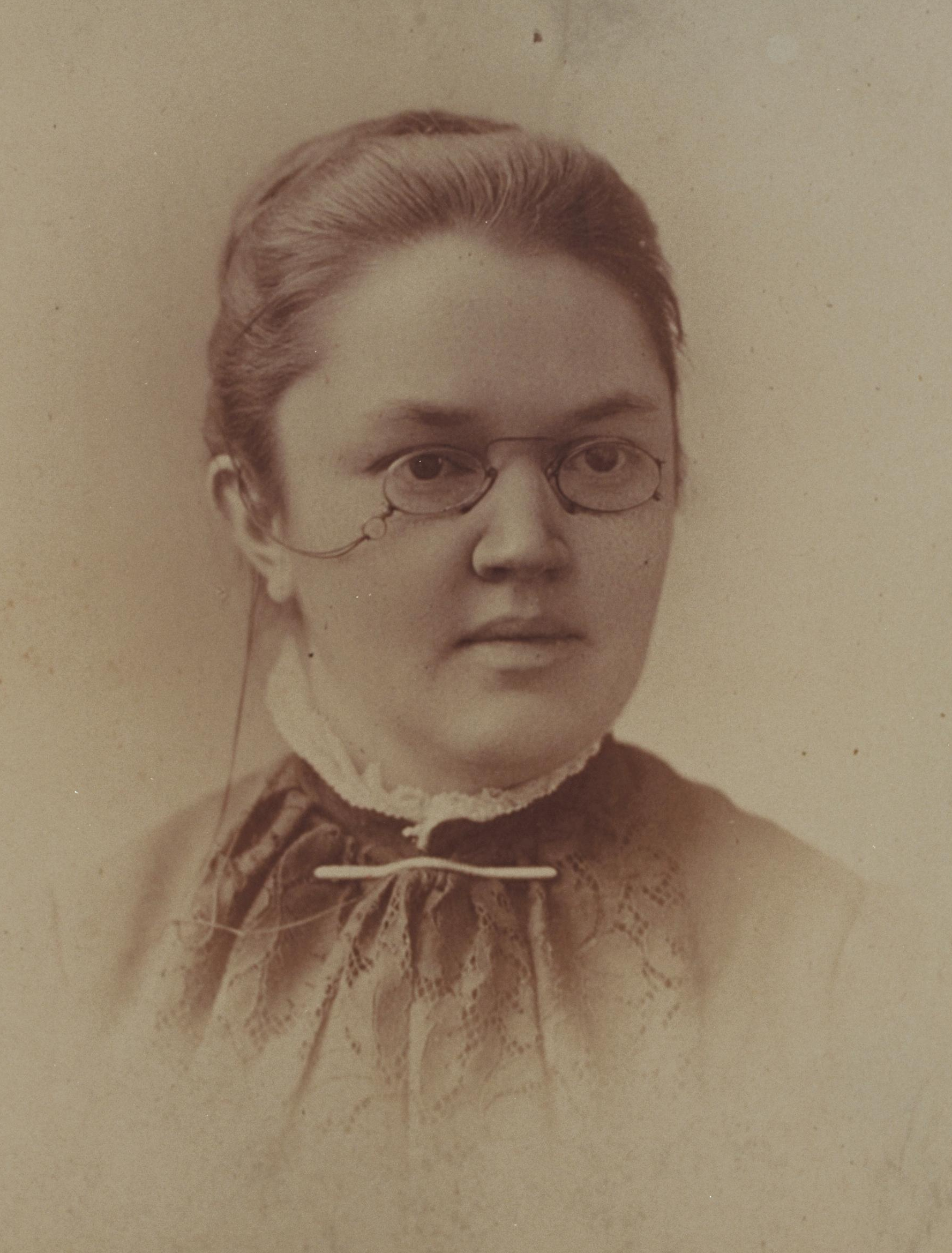
- Born: August 12, 1859; Falmouth, Massachusetts, U.S.
- Died: March 28, 1929 (aged 69); Wellesley, Massachusetts, U.S.
- Resting place: Oak Grove Cemetery, Falmouth, MA,
- Education: Wellesley College (BA, MA); Oxford University
- Occupations: Author; poet; professor
- Partner: Katharine Coman
- Writing career
- Genre: Poetry
- Notable works: "America the Beautiful"; Goody Santa Claus on a Sleigh Ride
- Notable awards: Golden Rose Award

Signature
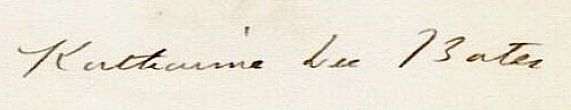

Katharine Lee Bates (August 12, 1859 – March 28, 1929) was an American author and poet, chiefly remembered for her anthem "America the Beautiful", but also for her many books and articles on social reform, on which she was a noted speaker.

Bates enjoyed close links with Wellesley College, Massachusetts, where she had graduated with a B.A., and later became a professor of English literature, helping to launch American literature as an academic speciality, and writing one of the first-ever college textbooks on it. She never married, possibly because she would have lost tenure if she had. Throughout her long career at Wellesley, she shared a house with her close friend and companion Katharine Coman. Some scholars have assumed that this was a lesbian relationship, considering some exchanges of letters sufficient proof; others believe their relationship may have been a platonic "Boston marriage" in the contemporary phrase.

== Life and career ==
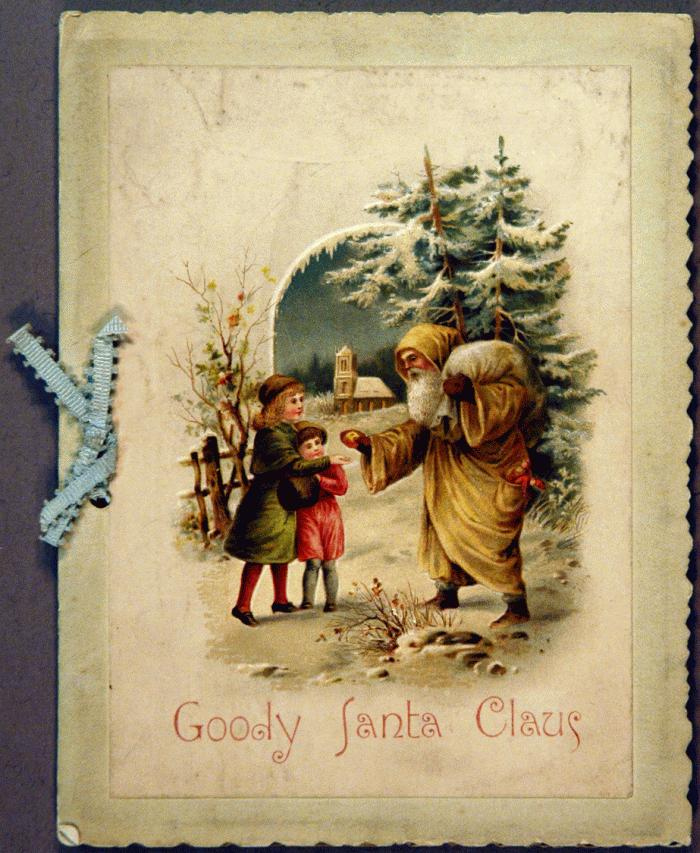
Cover of an early edition of Goody Santa Claus

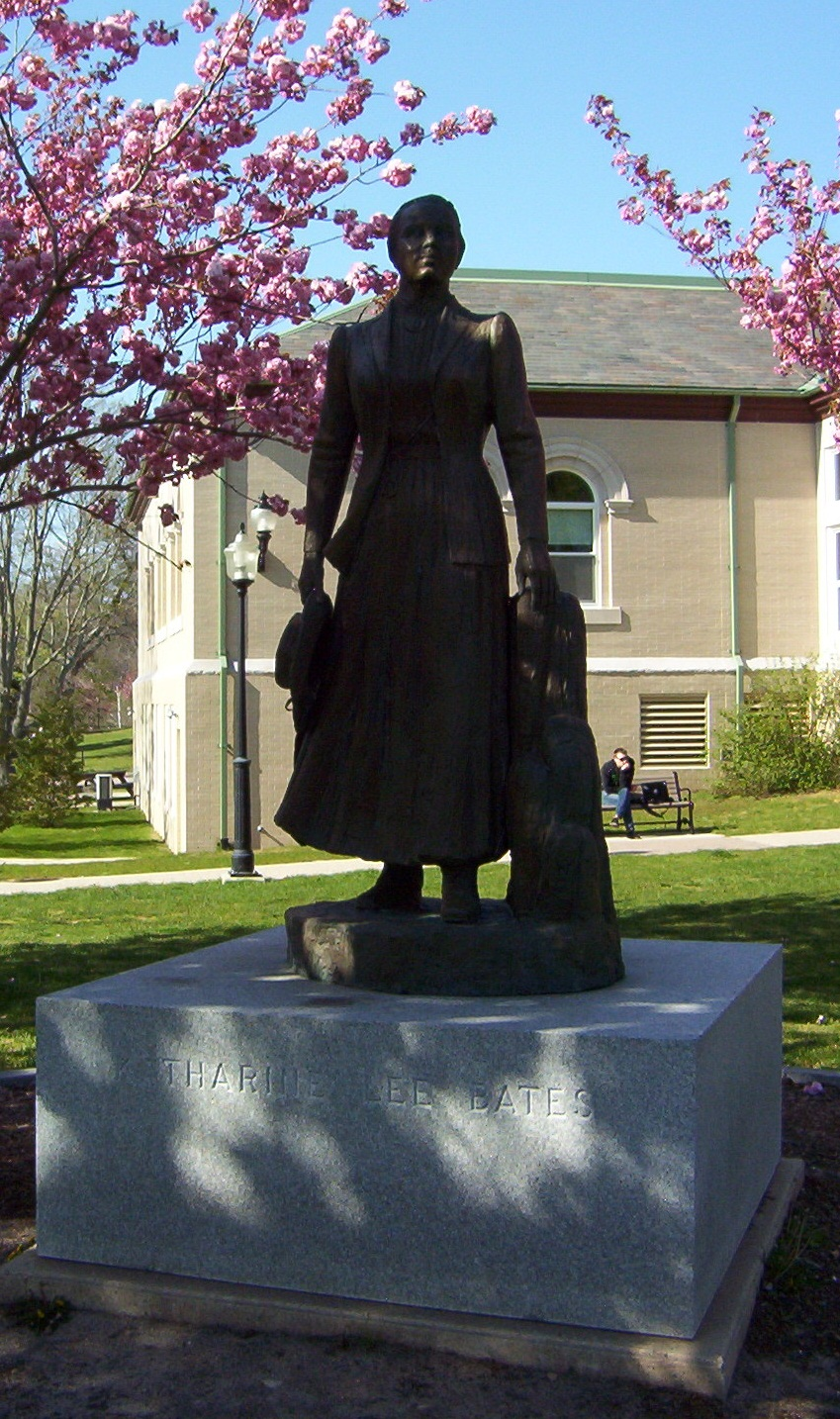
Statue of Katharine Lee Bates at the Falmouth Public Library in Falmouth, Massachusetts.

Bates was born in Falmouth, Massachusetts, to the town's Congregational minister William Bates and Cornelia Frances (Lee) Bates. Her father died a few weeks after she was born, and she was primarily raised by her mother and a literary aunt, both of whom had graduated from the all-women's Mount Holyoke Seminary. She attended Wellesley High School (then called Needham High School) in 1872 and then Newton High School until 1876. Bates entered Wellesley College, a women's college, as part of its second class in 1876. She graduated with a B.A. in 1880. She taught at Natick High School in 1880–81 and at Dana Hall School from 1881 until 1885.

In 1889, Bates's young adult novel Rose and Thorn won a prize awarded by the Congregational Sunday School and Publishing Society. It incorporated poor and working class women as characters to teach readers about social reform. She popularized the concept of Mrs. Claus in her poem "Goody Santa Claus on a Sleigh Ride" from the collection Sunshine and other Verses for Children (1889). The Mrs. Claus character is the chief organizer of Christmas Eve.

Bates used prize money from Rose and Thorn to travel to England and study at Oxford University in 1890–91. She then returned to Wellesley as an associate professor in 1891, earned her M.A. there, and was promoted to a full professor of English literature. Near the end of the Spanish–American War, she worked as a war correspondent for The New York Times, and strove to reduce widely-circulating negative stereotypes about Spaniards. She contributed regularly to periodicals (sometimes under the pseudonym James Lincoln), including The Atlantic Monthly, Boston Evening Transcript, Christian Century, Lippincott's, and The Delineator.

In 1900, she wrote Spanish Highways and Byways for The New York Times, a travelogue that not only described with beauty and precision the landscapes of a post-war Spain, but also made a commentary on the political and social panorama that she found once the war was over. Bates's style is distinct in that, if Spain is thought of as an orientalized East inside the West, then she applied the Oriental picturesquism concepts to Spanish models, which is a logical paradox. She uses this picturesque technique to depict not just the natural world and art, but also the subjects themselves.

In 1906, Bates and her brother, Arthur, signed a mortgage for a Wellesley houselot and house (now 70 Curve St.) to be built on it for the Bates family (Cornelia, Jeanne, and Katharine) and their tenants. Among the latter was Katharine Coman, who would eventually rent an attic bedroom and photographic darkroom. While the house was being built, Bates traveled to Egypt and the Holy Land with Wellesley College president Caroline Hazard. Upon returning to Wellesley, Bates named the house "The Scarab," after the sacred Egyptian insect she admired as "always climbing."

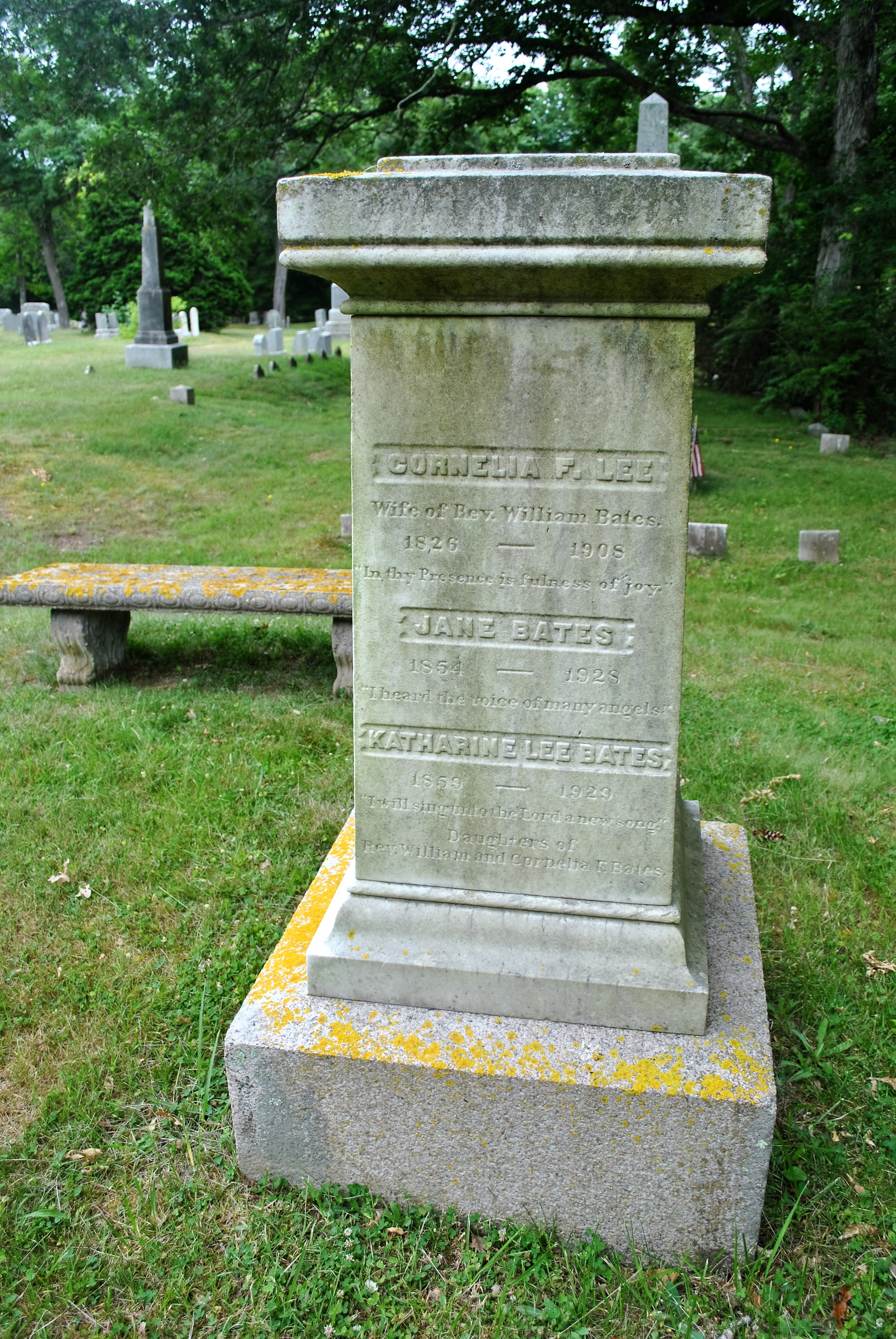
Oak Grove Cemetery, Falmouth, MA, Original tombstone

While working at Wellesley, Bates was elected a member of the newly-formed Pi Gamma Mu honor society for the social sciences because of her interest in history and politics. She retired from Wellesley in 1925 at the age of 66. In retirement, Bates continued to write and to publish poetry, and was in great demand as a writer and speaker.

Bates was also a social activist interested in the struggles of women, workers, people of color, tenement residents, immigrants, and poor people. She helped organize the Denison House, a college women's settlement house, with other women friends and colleagues in 1892. She wrote and spoke extensively about the need for social reform and was an avid advocate for the global peace movement that emerged after World War I. She was especially active in attempts to establish the League of Nations. Long an active Republican, Bates broke with the party to endorse Democratic presidential candidate John W. Davis in 1924 because of Republican opposition to American participation in the League of Nations. She said: "Though born and bred in the Republican camp, I cannot bear their betrayal of Mr. Wilson and their rejection of the League of Nations, our one hope of peace on earth." Thinking of herself as a "global citizen," Bates decried the American policy of isolationism.

Bates died in Wellesley, Massachusetts, on March 28, 1929, aged 69, while listening to a friend read poetry to her. She is buried in Oak Grove Cemetery at Falmouth. Most of her papers are housed at the Wellesley College Archives and include "diaries, correspondences, musical scores, publications, scrapbooks, manuscripts, reports, memorials and tributes, memorabilia; concerning "America the Beautiful" and other writings of Katharine Lee Bates, her travels, and her life at Wellesley and in Falmouth, Mass."

== "America the Beautiful" ==
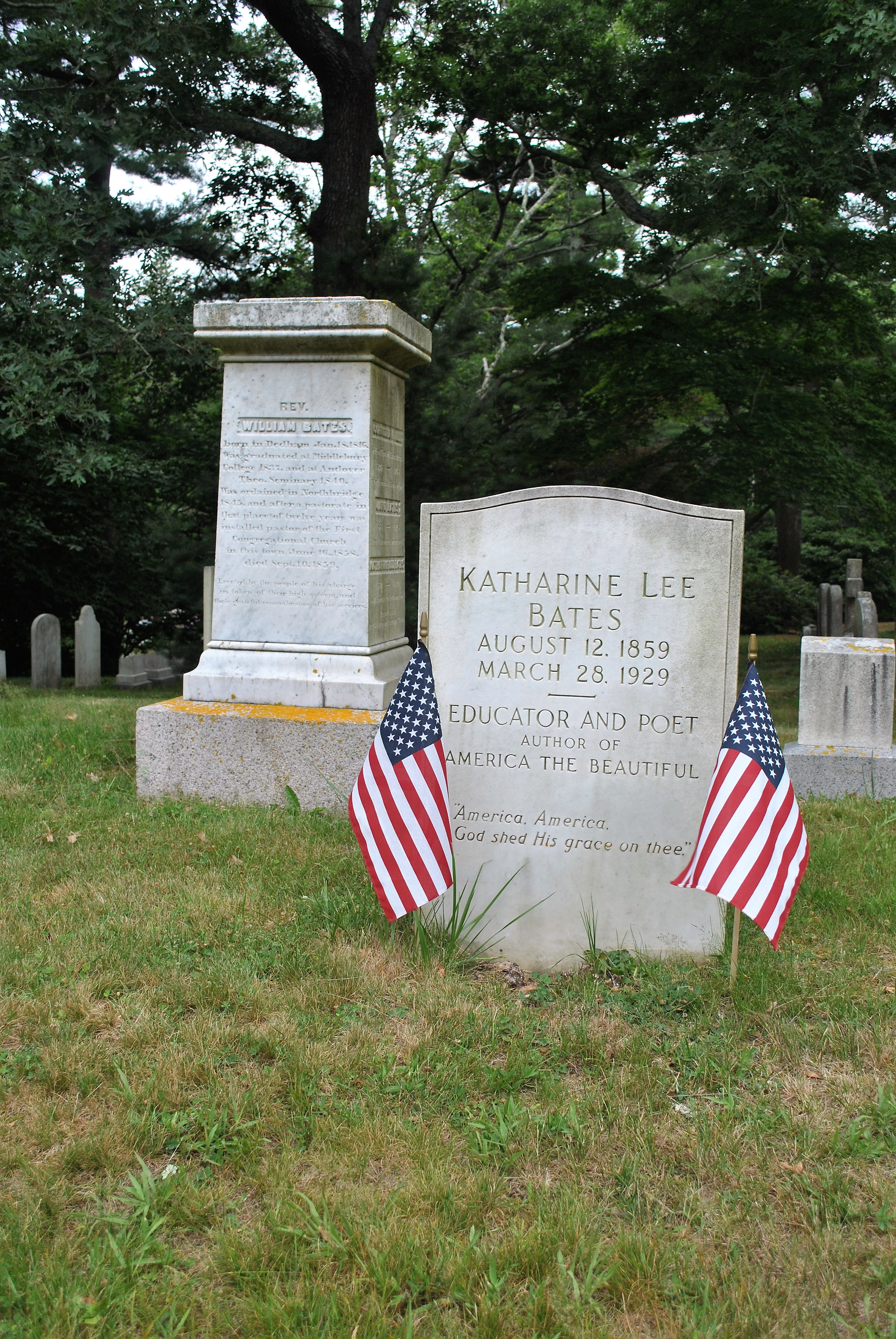
Oak Grove Cemetery, Falmouth, MA, new monument from the Falmouth town

The first draft of "America the Beautiful" was hastily jotted down in a notebook during the summer of 1893, which Bates spent teaching English at Colorado College in Colorado Springs, Colorado. Later she remembered:

One day some of the other teachers and I decided to go on a trip to 14,000-foot Pikes Peak. We hired a prairie wagon. Near the top we had to leave the wagon and go the rest of the way on mules. I was very tired. But when I saw the view, I felt great joy. All the wonder of America seemed displayed there, with the sea-like expanse.

Bates had personally experienced sexist prejudice and discrimination, had witnessed the ravages of the industrial revolution in both America and Britain, had seen first hand urban poverty and misery, and keenly wished for equality. It was this desire for an all-inclusive egalitarian American community that inspired the poem, which was written during the severe economic depression of 1893. The words to her famous poem first appeared in print in The Congregationalist, a weekly journal, for Independence Day, 1895. The poem reached a wider audience when her revised version was printed in the Boston Evening Transcript on November 19, 1904. Her final expanded version was written in 1913. When a version appeared in her collection America the Beautiful, and Other Poems (1912), a reviewer in the New York Times wrote: "we intend no derogation to Miss Katharine Lee Bates when we say that she is a good minor poet." On November 11, 1918, a battalion of the 26th Infantry Division of the US Army (colloquially known as the Yankee Division) sang "America the Beautiful" upon hearing the announcement of the Armistice. The hymn has been sung to several tunes, but the familiar one is by Samuel A. Ward (1847–1903), written for his hymn "Materna" (1882).

== Relationship with Katharine Coman ==
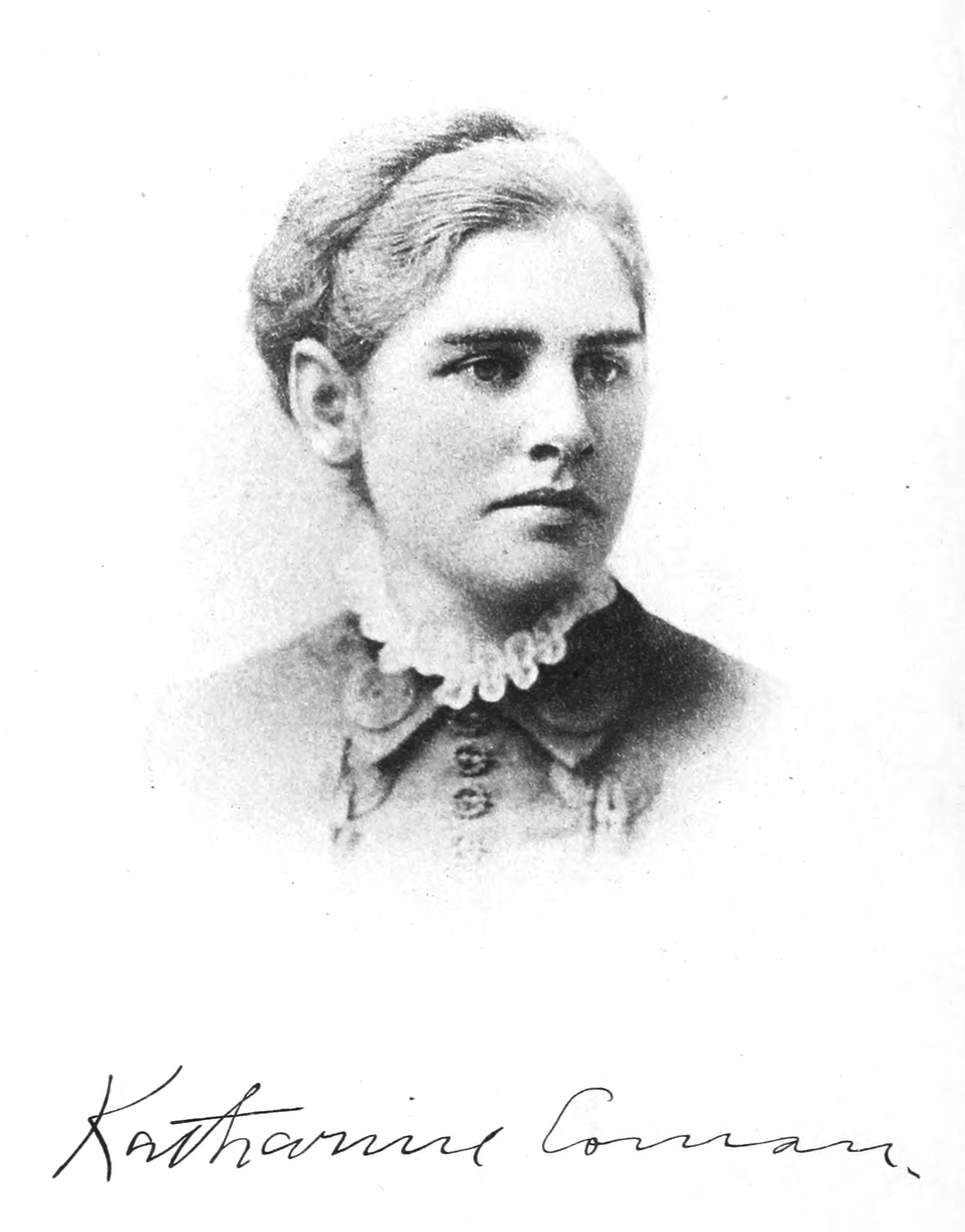
Photo of Katharine Coman, also a professor at Wellesley.

The nature of Bates's relationship with her Wellesley College faculty colleague, friend, occasional traveling companion, and "Scarab House" tenant Katharine Coman has been the subject of scholarly discussion for four decades. In her 2017 biography of Bates, Melinda M. Ponder describes Bates as an independent-minded social activist who set an example for women's intellectualism and independence in the late 1800s. Bates' adult diaries and surviving letters confirm Bates's warm friendships with several female peers, as well as her intense emotional involvement with, and delight in the companionship of, two men: Oscar Triggs, whom she met while at Oxford, and Theophilus Huntington Root, the brother of one of her Wellesley classmates. That said, the end of her courtship with Theophilus Root precipitated in Bates a period of suicidal depression. Bates never married. Had she done so, she would have lost her tenure-track Wellesley faculty position, as well as some of the independence she was accustomed to from her childhood in a woman-led household and subsequent life-course.

Bates destroyed most of the letters she and Coman had written to each other. One of the few to survive was written by Bates to Coman in 1893, just before she left Oxford to return to Wellesley: "You are always in my heart and in my longings... It was the living away from you that made, at first, the prospect of leaving Wellesley so heartachy ... and it seemed least of all possible when I had just found the long-desire way to your dearest heart." Ponder stresses Coman's importance to Bates in showing her how college professors like themselves could "challenge accepted attitudes towards women's social, economic, cultural, and gender roles". In her virtuosic corona of sonnets "In Bohemia," Bates celebrates the "vitality, adventurous spirit, and abiding spiritual presence of their love".

In earlier commentary, Judith Schwarz interpreted Bates's letters and poems to Coman as evidence of a lesbian relationship, citing as an example Bates's 1891 letter to Coman: "It was never very possible to leave Wellesley [for good], because so many love-anchors held me there, and it seemed least of all possible when I had just found the long-desired way to your dearest heart... Of course I want to come to you, very much as I want to come to Heaven." And in 1999, historian Lillian Faderman also concluded that the relationship between Bates and Coman was a "lesbian arrangement," including them among the other women faculty at Wellesley who paired off with each other. Other scholars contest the use of the term lesbian to describe what was characterized at the time as a "Boston marriage". Writes one: "We cannot say with certainty what sexual connotations these relationships conveyed. We do know that these relationships were deeply intellectual; they fostered verbal and physical expressions of love." Certainly, Bates long shared rental housing with various Wellesley faculty members, all of whom thereby economized while earning small salaries. Occasionally, she traveled with her long-time friend, Katharine Coman. And in 1910, when a colleague described "free-flying spinsters" as "fringe on the garment of life", Bates answered: "I always thought the fringe had the best of it. I don't think I mind not being woven in."

Bates's and Coman's connection is perhaps destined to be interpreted differently by different readers forever. The facts remain that Coman and Bates met at Wellesley by 1890 when the president of Wellesley College, Alice Freeman Palmer, determined to add women to the college's faculty. Coman served as a history and political economy professor, and founded the Wellesley College Economics Department. During her lifetime, Coman was nearly as well known as Bates. Both colleagues became influential independent women within their fields during their lifetimes; and Bates's work has continued to influence American life and literature to this day. In the days after Coman's death from breast cancer in 1915, Bates wrote a memorial to Coman, which is thought to be the first American narrative about breast cancer. Bates intended that the manuscript be privately circulated among the women's close circle of friends and family, writing on the title page: "For Katharine Coman's family and innermost circle of friends: Not for print nor in any way for general circulation." In 1922, Bates published Yellow Clover: A Book of Remembrance, a collection of poems she had addressed to Coman while alive or since her death. She dedicated the volume to Coman, referred to her as "my Friend [sic]", and included as a "Prefatory Note" a three-page biography of Coman largely focused on her career as an economist and historian, but written in a tone personal enough to allow a reference to her "vigorous and adventurous personality" and her "undaunted courage" in continuing to work during her final illness.

== Honors ==
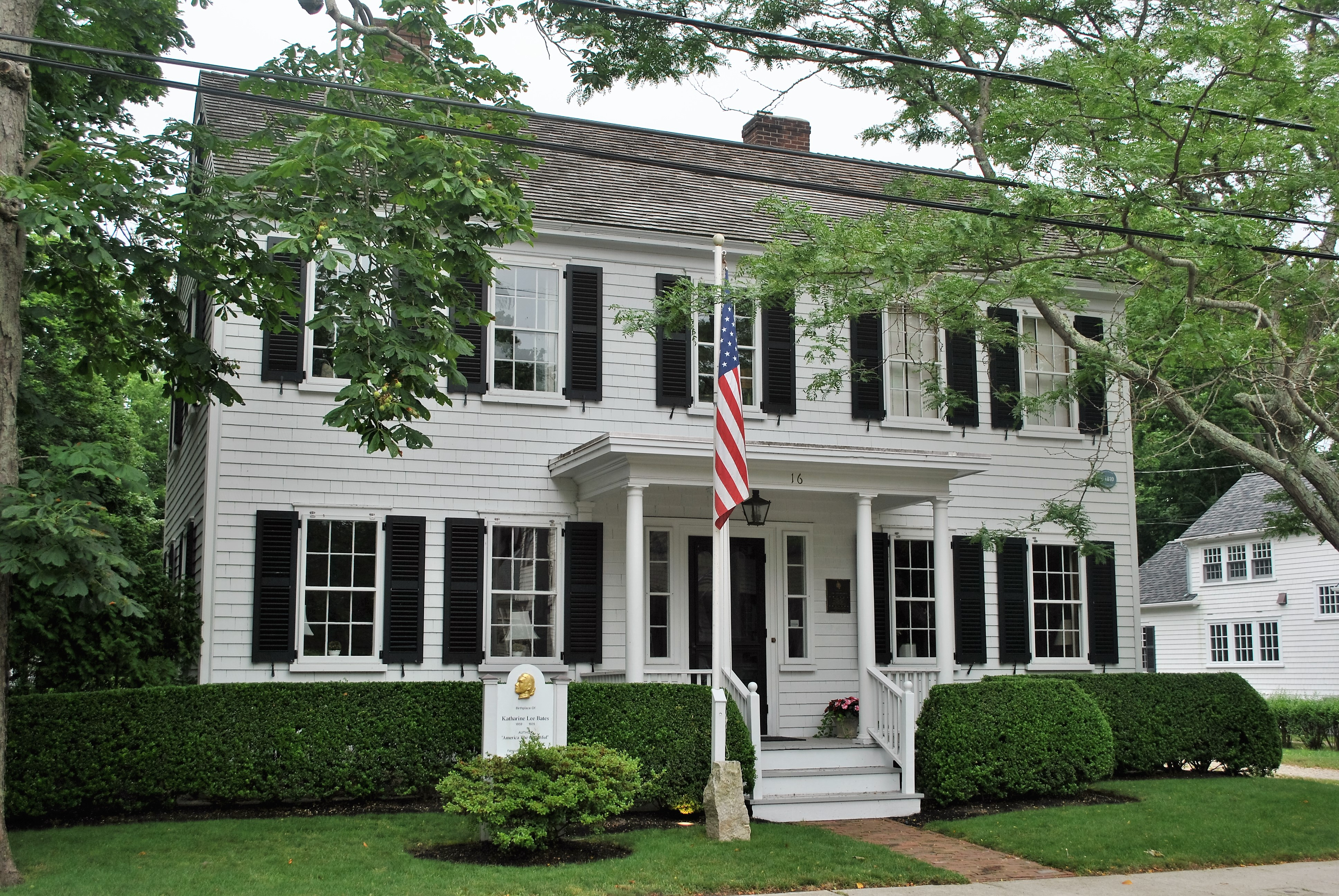
Katharine Lee Bates House, Falmouth, Massachusetts

The Bates family home on Falmouth's Main Street is preserved by the Falmouth Historical Society. There is also a street named in her honor, "Katharine Lee Bates Road" in Falmouth. The Shining Sea Bikeway, named in honor of Bates, extends 11 miles from North Falmouth to Woods Hole, passing just a block from the Bates home. A plaque marks the site of the home where she lived as an adult on Centre Street in Newton, Massachusetts. The historic home and birthplace of Bates in Falmouth, was sold to Ruth P. Clark in November 2013 for $1,200,000.

The Katharine Lee Bates Elementary School on Elmwood Road in Wellesley, Massachusetts, and the Katharine Lee Bates Elementary School, founded in 1957 in Colorado Springs, Colorado, and Bates Hall dormitory at Wellesley College are named for her. The Katharine Lee Bates Chair in English Composition and Literature was established at Wellesley shortly after her death.

Bates was inducted into the Songwriters Hall of Fame in 1970.

Collections of Bates's manuscripts are housed at the Arthur and Elizabeth Schlesinger Library on the History of Women in America, Radcliffe College; Falmouth Historical Society; Houghton Library, Harvard University; Wellesley College Archives.

In 2012, she was named by Equality Forum as one of their 31 Icons of the 2015 LGBT History Month.

== Works ==
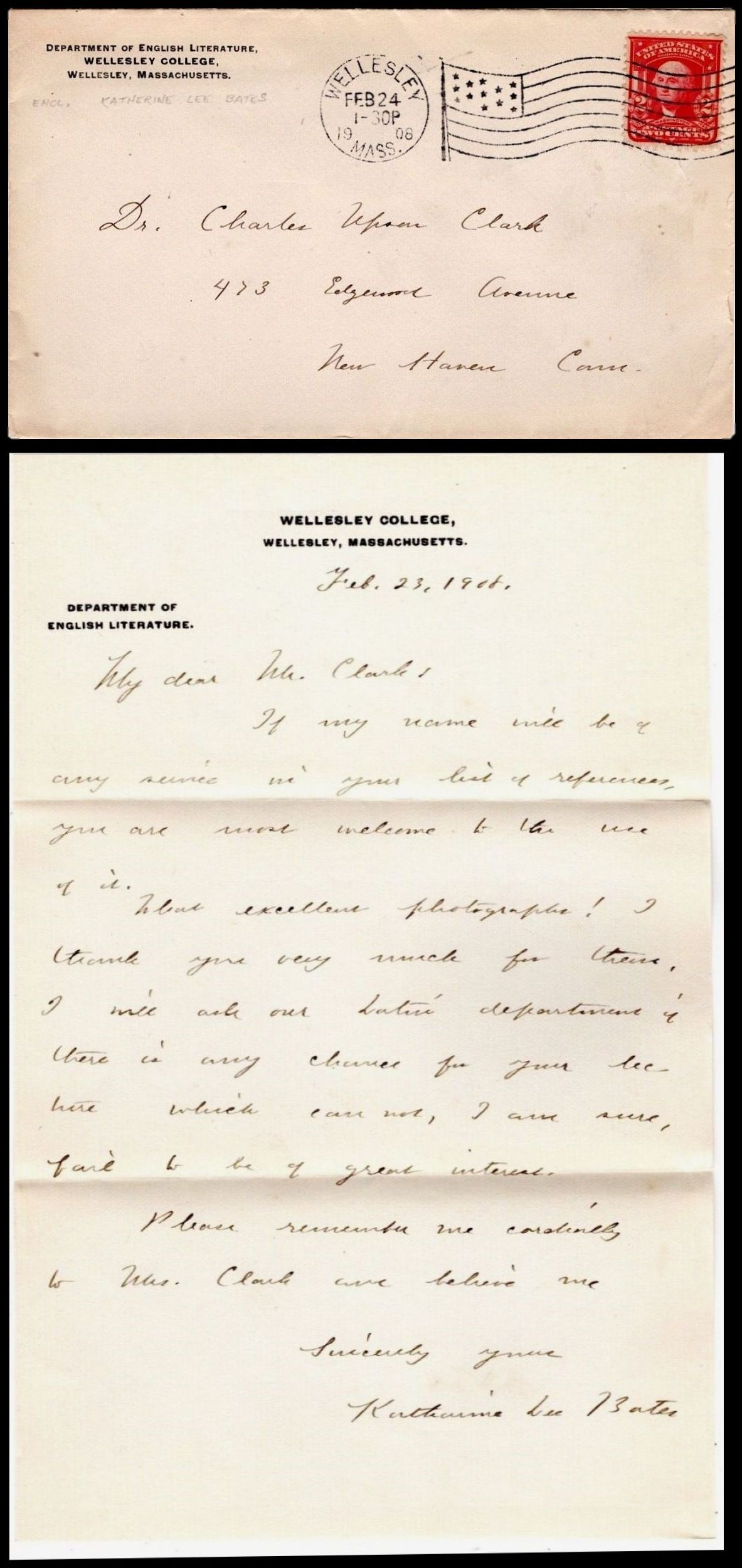
Letter from Katherine Bates at the Department of English Literature, to a Mr. Clark, giving him permission to use her name as a reference. Letter dated February 23, 1908

=== Author ===
- The College Beautiful, and Other Poems, Houghton (Cambridge, Massachusetts), 1887.
- Rose and Thorn, Congregational Sunday-School and Publishing Society (Boston, MA), 1889.
- Hermit Island, Lothrop (Boston, MA), 1890.
- Sunshine, and Other Verses for Children, Wellesley Alumnae (Boston, MA), 1890.
- The English Religious Drama, Macmillan (New York, NY), 1893, reprinted, Kennikat Press (Port Washington, NY), 1966.
- American Literature, Chautauqua Press (New York, NY), 1897.
- Spanish Highways and Byways, Macmillan (New York, NY), 1900.
- (As James Lincoln) Relishes of Rhyme, Richard G. Badger (Boston, MA), 1903.
- From Gretna Green to Land's End: A Literary Journey in England, photographs by Katharine Coman, Crowell (New York, NY), 1907.
- The Story of Chaucer's Canterbury Pilgrims, Rand, McNally (Chicago, IL), 1909.
- America the Beautiful, and Other Poems, Crowell (New York, NY), 1911.
- In Sunny Spain with Pilarica and Rafael, Dutton (New York, NY), 1913.
- Chaucer's Canterbury Pilgrims, Retold by Katharine Lee Bates, illustrated by Angus MacDonall, color plates by Milo Winter, Rand, McNally (Chicago, IL), 1914.
- Fairy Gold, Dutton, (New York, NY), 1916.
- The Retinue, and Other Poems, Dutton (New York, NY), 1918.
- Sigurd Our Golden Collie, and Other Comrades of the Road, Dutton (New York, NY), 1919.
- Yellow Clover, A Book of Remembrance, Dutton (New York, NY), 1922.
- Little Robin Stay-Behind, and Other Plays in Verse for Children, Woman's Press (New York, NY), 1923.
- The Pilgrim Ship, Woman's Press (New York, NY), 1926.
- America the Dream, Crowell (New York, NY), 1930.
- An Autobiography, in Brief, of Katharine Lee Bates, Enterprise Press (Falmouth, MA), 1930.
- Selected Poems of Katharine Lee Bates, edited by Marion Pelton Guild, Houghton Mifflin (Boston, MA), 1930.

=== Compiler ===
- Browning Studies: Bibliography, Robinson (Boston, MA), 1896.
- English Drama: A Working Basis, Robinson(Boston, MA), 1896, enlarged as Shakespeare: Selective Bibliography and Biographical Notes, compiled by Bates and Lilla Weed, Wellesley College (Wellesley, MA), 1913. Compiled with Lydia Boker Godfrey.
- English History Told by English Poets, Macmillan (New York, NY), 1902. Compiled with Katharine Coman.

=== Contributor ===
- Historic Towns of New England, edited by Lyman P. Powell, Putnam (New York, NY), 1898.

=== Editor ===
- The Wedding Day Book, Lothrop (Boston, MA), 1882, published as The Wedding-Day Book, with the Congratulations of the Poets, Lothrop (Boston, MA), 1895.
- Coleridge's The Rime of the Ancient Mariner|Ancient Mariner, Leach, Shewell & Sanborn (Boston, MA), 1889.
- Ballad Book, Leach, Shewell & Sanborn (Boston, MA), 1890, reprinted, Books for Libraries Press (Freeport, NY), 1969.
- Shakespeare's Comedy of The Merchant of Venice, Leach, Shewell & Sanborn (Boston, MA), 1894.
- Shakespeare's Comedy of A Midsummer Night's Dream, Leach, Shewell & Sanborn (Boston, MA), 1895.
- Shakespeare's Comedy of As You Like It, Leach, Shewell & Sanborn (Boston, MA), 1896.
- Stories from the Chap-Book, Stone (Chicago, IL), 1896.
- Keats's The Eve of St. Agnes, and Other Poems, Silver, Burdett, (New York, NY), 1902.
- The Works of Nathaniel Hawthorne, fourteen volumes, Crowell (New York, NY), 1902.
- Hamilton Wright Mabie, Norse Stories Retold from the Eddas, Rand, McNally, Chicago, 1902.
- The Poems of Alice and Phoebe Cary, Crowell (New York, NY), 1903.
- John Ruskin, The King of the Golden River; or, the Black Brothers: A Legend of Stiria, illustrated by John C. Johansen, Rand, McNally (Chicago, IL), 1903.
- Tennyson's The Princess, American Book Co. (New York, NY), 1904.
- Tennyson's Gareth and Lynette, Lancelot and Elaine, The Passing of Arthur, Sibley (Boston, MA), 1905.
- The New Irish Drama, Drama League of America (Chicago, IL), 1911.
- Thomas Heywood, A Woman Killed with Kindness, and the Faire Maide of the West, Heath (Boston, MA), 1917.
- Once Upon a Time; A Book of Old-Time Fairy Tales, illustrated by Margaret Evans Price, Rand, McNally (Chicago, IL), 1921.
- Tom Thumb and Other Old-Time Fairy Tales, illustrated by Price, Rand, McNally (Chicago, IL), 1926.
- Jack the Giant-Killer, Rand, McNally (Chicago, IL), 1937.
- Jack and the Beanstalk; also Toads and Diamonds, Rand, McNally (Chicago, IL), 1937.

=== Introduction ===
- Nathaniel Hawthorne, Our Old Home: A Series of English Sketches, Crowell (New York, NY), 1906.
- Helen Sanborn, Anne of Brittany, Lothrop, Lee & Shepard (Boston, MA), 1917.
- Helen Corke, The World's Family, Oxford University Press (New York, NY), 1930.

=== Translator ===
- Gustavo Adolfo Becquer, Romantic Legends of Spain, Crowell (New York). With Cornelia Frances Bates.
