= Ghar, Gurdaspur =

Ghar
- Village
- Location in Punjab, India Ghar (India)
- Coordinates: 32.4647497°N 75.8606102°E
- Country: India
- State: Punjab
- District: Pathankot
- Tehsil: Dhar Kalan

Government
  - Type: Panchayat raj
  - Body: Gram panchayat

Area
  - Total: 400 ha (990 acres)
- Elevation: 524 m (1,719 ft)

Population (2011)
  - Total: 852
  - Density: 210/km^{2} (550/sq mi)
  - Total Households: 179
- Sex ratio 437/415 ♂/♀

Languages
  - Official: Punjabi, Hindi
- Time zone: UTC+5:30 (IST)
- PIN: 145022
- Telephone: 01870
- ISO 3166 code: IN-PB
- Vehicle registration: PB-06
- Website: pathankot.nic.in

Ghar is a village in Dhar Kalan tehsil in Pathankot district of Indian state of Punjab. It is located 12 kilometres (7.5 mi) from Pathankot City, district headquarters and 279 kilometres (173 mi) from state capital Chandigarh. The village is administrated by Sarpanch an elected representative of the village.

== Demography ==
As of 2011, the village has a total number of 179 houses and a population of 852 of which 437 are males while 415 are females according to the report published by Census India in 2011. The literacy rate of the village is 76.34%, highest than the state average of 75.84%. The population of children under the age of 6 years is 104 which is 12.21% of total population of the village, and child sex ratio is approximately 1039 highest than the state average of 846.

Most of the people are from Schedule Caste which constitutes 37.68% of total population in the village. The town does not have any Schedule Tribe population so far.

As per census 2011, 325 people were engaged in work activities out of the total population of the village which includes 238 males and 87 females. According to census survey report 2011, 48.31% workers describe their work as main work and 51.69% workers are involved in marginal activity providing the livelihood for less than 6 months.

== Transport ==
The nearest train station is located 36 kilometres (22 mi) away in Dalhousie road and Sri Guru Ram Dass Jee International Airport is 173 kilometres (107 mi) away from the village.

== See also ==
- List of villages in India
