= Ex-wife =

Ex-wife may refer to:

- Ex-wife (divorce), a former wife after dissolution of marriage
- Ex-Wife (Ursula Parrott), a 1929 novel by Ursula Parrott
- Ex-Wife (TV series), a 2013 Russian television series
- The Ex-Wife, a 2022 British television miniseries
