= Work spouse =

Co-worker of a special relationship

Work spouse, a term mostly used in American English, refers to a co-worker, with whom one shares a special relationship, having bonds similar to those of a marriage. Early references suggest that a work spouse may not just be a co-worker, but can also be someone in a similar field who the individual works closely with from a partnering company.

One formal definition of such a relationship is "a special friendship" with a work colleague characterized by a close emotional bond, high levels of disclosure and support, and mutual trust, honesty, loyalty, and respect."

A work spouse is also referred to as workplace spouse, work wife, or office husband, work husband, or wusband.

== Social documentation ==
In one 2006 survey, 32% of workers said they had an "office husband" or "office wife".

A CNN Money article characterizes the relationship as having the "immediate intimacy [of marriage] without commitment."

One source characterizes the relationships as "close, opposite-sex couplings, with no strings attached." The phrase is, however, sometimes used for same-sex relationships.

== Sociological and psychological implications ==
Due to the many hours of a day spent at work, having someone there who has an intuitive understanding of the pressures, personalities, interactions, and underlying narratives of the workplace society can add safety and comfort to what can otherwise be an alienating environment.

"Work marriage" appears to be a genuinely caring relationship fostered by the propinquity effect and associated with love-like feelings and possibly limerence. Some "work spouses" admit that while sexual attraction between them is present, it is rarely acted upon, but rather "channeled" into a productive collaboration.

== Historical uses ==
The phrase "office wife" was common during the 1930s, popularized by Faith Baldwin's 1930 novel The Office Wife and its film adaptation. But the concept, if not the exact phrase, is much older: a 1933 New York Times article says:

It is curious that the phrase "office wife" originated with Gladstone. He used to say that a Minister and his secretary should understand each other as perfectly as a husband and wife, which principle he reduced to a system.

"Office wife" carried the connotation of subordinance or subservience. As feminism began to take hold in the 1980s, it became common to hear that "Many secretaries resent the 'office wife' syndrome," referring to being asked to do such things as paying personal bills for a boss, picking up everything from dry cleaning, or dusting the office. "I'm getting paid as a secretary," said one secretary. "I'm not a personal servant."

== Modern usage ==
According to Timothy Noah, writing in Slate, "The terms 'work wife,' 'work husband,' and 'work marriage' entered the national lexicon in 1987, when the writer David Owen wrote an Atlantic essay describing a particular platonic intimacy that frequently arises between male and female employees working in close proximity."

An executive coach and workplace adviser noted that as of 2005, "The workplace spouse is a relatively new concept ... Many people don't know what to make of it yet. It is only within the last 25 years that men and women have become peers in the workplace ... This new camaraderie, coupled with long hours spent at work, has caused a fundamental shift in the way people conduct business and interact with one another."

== Television ==
Male–female television news co-anchors are sometimes referred to as "TV spouses" for the way they work together and present themselves side by side. "I've known Don for 14 years," said Minneapolis anchor Amelia Santaniello of her co-anchor. "We like to joke he was my first TV husband." Miami anchor Pam Giganti called her co-anchor "my partner and my TV husband for the past eight years." Anchor Mark Bradshaw writes, "I've gone through many 'TV wives'. I can't even remember all their names. Bad husband."

Actress Ana Gasteyer refers to actor Chris Parnell as her "wusband", or work husband, whose wife she has played in The Groundlings, in Saturday Night Live sketches, and on Suburgatory: "I have my husband, Charlie, and then Chris Parnell ... He's my work husband, my 'wusband.'"

On Live with Kelly and Ryan, the co-hosts Kelly Ripa and former host Ryan Seacrest frequently talked about their work spouse dynamic on their show.

== See also ==
- Emotional affair
- Queerplatonic relationship
