= Ethnic stereotype =

Belief in certain typical characteristics for a grouping of people

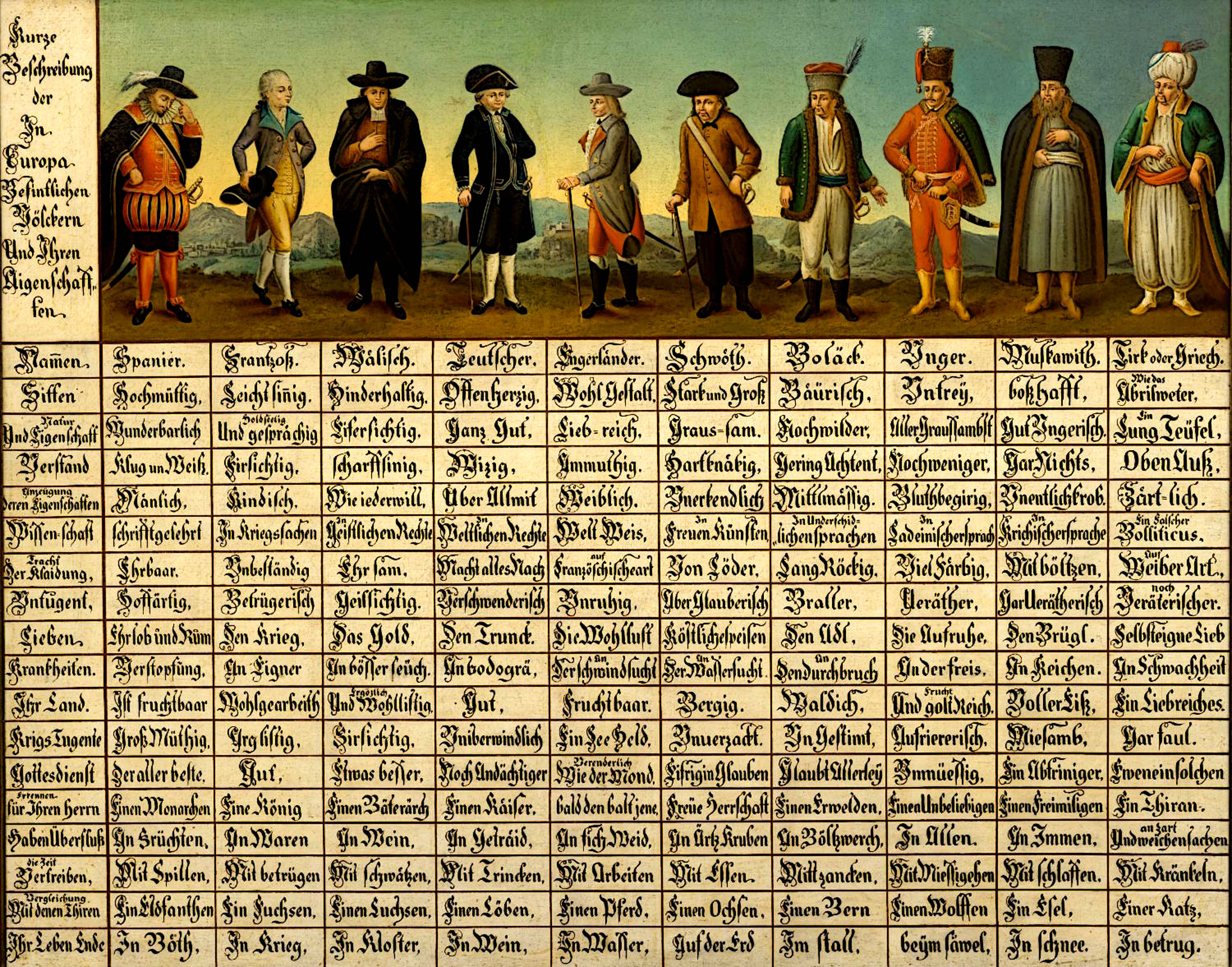
The Styrian Table of Peoples, an early-18th century work depicting ethnic stereotypes of Europeans

An ethnic stereotype or racial stereotype involves part of a system of beliefs about typical characteristics of members of a given ethnic group, their status, societal and cultural norms. A national stereotype does the same for a given nationality. Stereotyping is typically associated with racism, and may also be used for humor in jokes.

National stereotypes may relate either to one's own ethnicity/nationality or to a foreign/differing one. Stereotypes about one's own nation may aid in maintaining a national identity due to a collective relatability to a trait or characteristic, referred to as national character.

== Examples ==
According to an article by The Guardian titled "European Stereotypes: What Do We Think of Each Other and Are We Right?", the Europe stereotype towards Britain is as "drunken, semi-clad hooligans or else snobbish, stiff free marketers", their view towards France is "cowardly, arrogant, chauvinistic, erotomaniacs", and they see Germany as "ruddy-faced [and]subsist on a diet of beer and sausage". To Europe, Italy is "tax-dodging, Berlusconi-style Latin lovers and mama's boys, incapable of bravery", Poland is "heavy-drinking ultracatholics with a whiff of antisemitism", and Spain is "macho men and fiery women prone to regular siestas and fiestas". While some countries such as Germany proudly own their stereotype, others like Spain argue that theirs is a warped view based on experiences while on holiday instead of having actually lived there.

A Pew Global survey of the European countries United Kingdom, France, Germany, Spain, Italy, Greece, Poland, and Czechia found that European stereotypes found Germany to be both the most hardworking and least corrupt, Greece to be the least hardworking, and Italy to be the most corrupt. Five out of the eight countries thought their own country was the most corrupt.

According to Dana E. Maestro, media images and depictions play a vital role in our ability to perceive different ethnicities and construct various racial and ethnic stereotypes. Most of these portrayals are seen through media platforms such as televisions, social media and commercials create a convenient sketch of how they want a certain group of people to be represented. For example, White Americans are always overly presented in positions of prestige and power in comparison to their counterparts such as Latinos or African Americans that are usually represented around themes of criminality and subservience. On a whole, media can never be assumed to an insignificant oulet of information but are culturally effective conduits that can drive our personal narrative on specific ethnic stereotyping. Since minorities are not adequately represented in the media it can lead to a negative misinterpretation and limited media diversity.

According the J. Stanley Lemons, a stereotype for African-American men in the United States, specifically during the 1940s, was popularized through the use of comics and minstrel shows. African-American men were portrayed as having more animalistic features that alluded to the believe of their lack of knowledge and being considered second-class citizens during this time period. These features include oversized ear and mouths to indicate a monkey-like appearance. Portraying African-Americans as monkeys alludes to them being perceived as having limited intelligence. To convey that idea further, African-Americans were made not able to speak proper English. The white impersonators often used Black English Vernacular (BEV). The impersonators over exaggerated and misused BEV so that the speech barely made sense, which furthered the notion of African Americans being unintelligent.

== Ethnic jokes ==
It is sometimes held that such stereotypes often contain a "grain of truth". However, an extensive study by the personality psychologist Robert R. McCrae of the National Institute on Aging and colleagues found that they are generally untrustworthy.

Various anti-national phobias and prejudices operate with ethnic stereotypes.

Ethnic stereotypes are commonly portrayed in ethnic jokes, some of which some consider to be offensive to varying degrees. Richard M. Steers and Luciara Nardon, in their book about the global economy, use a variant of the "You have two cows" joke to illustrate the concept of cultural differences:

- Russian company: You have two cows. You drink some vodka and count them again. You have five cows. The Russian Mafia shows up and takes however many cows you have.
- Californian company: You have a million cows. Most of them are illegals.

They write that such jokes are considered funny because they are realistic caricatures of various cultures, and the pervasiveness of such jokes stems from the significant cultural differences. Steers and Nardon also state that others believe that cultural stereotypes in jokes of that kind must be viewed with caution.

== See also ==
- Discrimination
- Mores
- National character
- National personification
- Objectification of people
- Racial profiling
- Racial stereotyping in advertising
- Racism
- Stereotypes:
  - about indigenous peoples of North America
  - of Americans
    - of groups within the United States
  - of African Americans
  - of Jews
  - of South Asians
  - of East and Southeast Asians in the United States
- An Englishman, an Irishman and a Scotsman joke
- French anti-Southern sentiment during the Third Republic
