= Rose B. Knox =

American writer

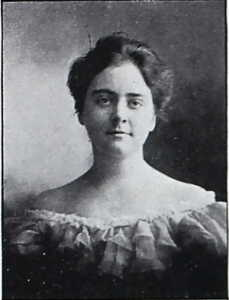
- Born: December 16, 1879
- Died: July 1974 (aged 94–95)

Rose Bell Knox (born December 16, 1879, in Talladega, Alabama-July 1974) was an American writer of children's literature of the early to mid-twentieth century. Her books included The Boys and Sally, Miss Jimmy Deane, Gray Caps, Marty and Company, Patsy's Progress, Footlights Afloat, The Step Twins, and Cousins' Luck (1940).

== Criticism ==
Although contemporary reviewers praised her work for its "cultural sensitivity," modern critics have called Knox's books "strikingly racist" because of their presentation of African Americans using racial stereotypes.
