= Mores =

Customary behaviour

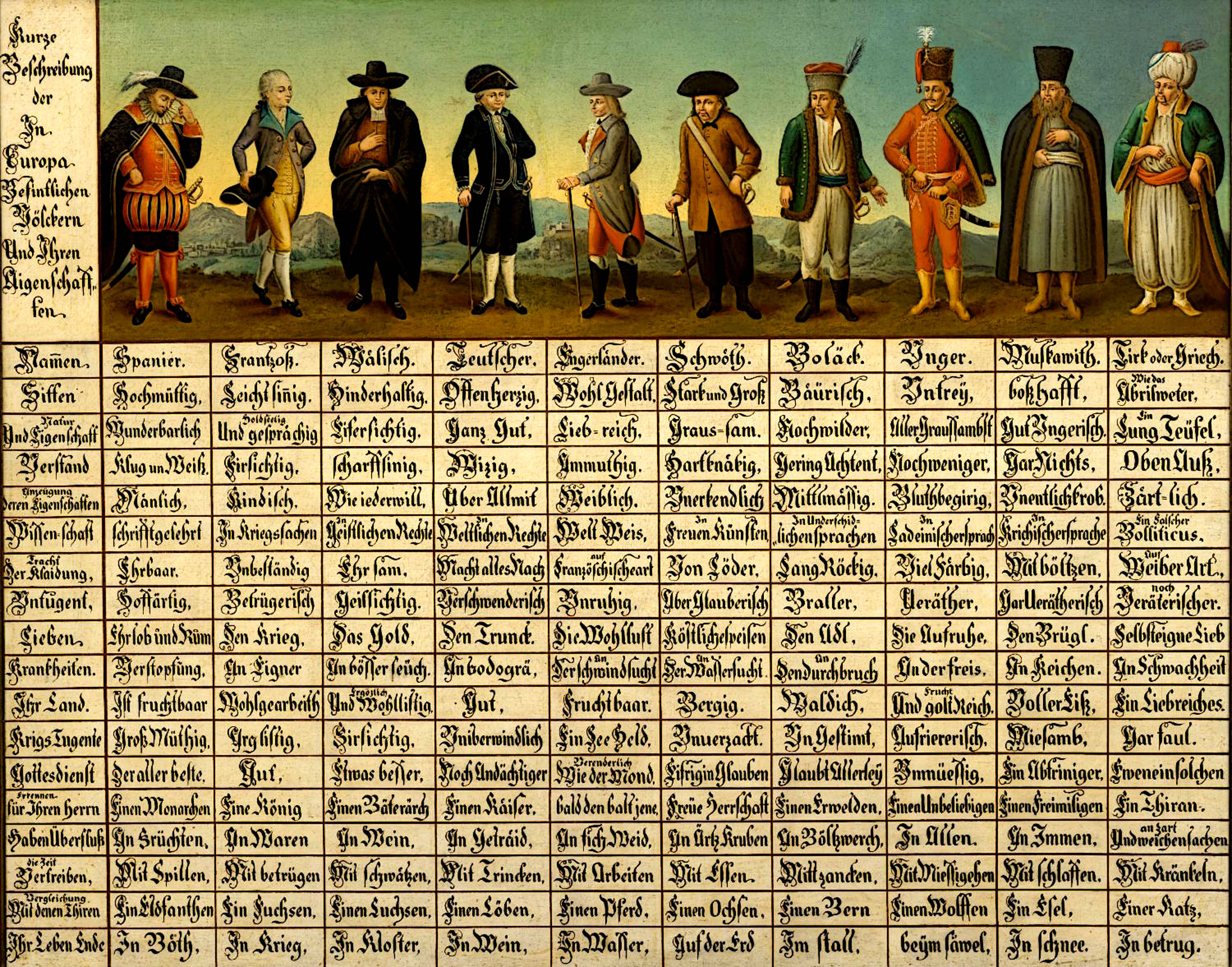
The Styrian Table of Peoples, an early-18th century work depicting stereotypical mores of Europeans

Mores (/ˈmɔːreɪz/, sometimes /ˈmɔːriːz/; from Latin mōrēs [ˈmoːreːs], plural form of singular mōs, meaning "manner, custom, usage, or habit") are social norms that are widely observed within a particular society or culture. Mores determine what is considered morally acceptable or unacceptable within any given culture. A folkway is what is created through interaction and that process is what organizes interactions through routine, repetition, habit and consistency.

William Graham Sumner (1840–1910), an early U.S. sociologist, introduced both the terms "mores" (1898) and "folkways" (1906) into modern sociology.

Mores are strict in the sense that they determine the difference between right and wrong in a given society, and people may be punished for their immorality which is common place in many societies in the world, at times with disapproval or ostracizing. Examples of mores include traditional prohibitions on lying, cheating, causing harm, alcohol use, drug use, marriage beliefs, gossip, slander, jealousy, disgracing or disrespecting parents, refusal to attend a funeral, politically incorrect humor, sports cheating, vandalism, leaving trash, plagiarism, bribery, corruption, saving face, respecting your elders, religious prescriptions and fiduciary responsibility.

Folkways are ways of thinking, acting and behaving in social groups which are agreed upon by the masses and are useful for the ordering of society. Folkways are spread through imitation, oral means or observation, and are meant to encompass the material, spiritual and verbal aspects of culture. Folkways meet the problems of social life; we feel security and order from their acceptance and application. Examples of folkways include: acceptable dress, manners, social etiquette, body language, posture, level of privacy, working hours and five day work week, acceptability of social drinking—abstaining or not from drinking during certain working hours, actions and behaviours in public places, school, university, business and religious institution, ceremonial situations, ritual, customary services and keeping personal space.

== Terminology ==
The English word morality comes from the same Latin root "mōrēs", as does the English noun moral. However, mores do not, as is commonly supposed, necessarily carry connotations of morality. Rather, morality can be seen as a subset of mores, held to be of central importance in view of their content, and often formalized into some kind of moral code or even into customary law. Etymological derivations include More danico, More judaico, More veneto, Coitus more ferarum, and O tempora, o mores!.

The Greek terms equivalent to Latin mores are ethos (ἔθος, ἦθος, 'character') or nomos (νόμος, 'law'). As with the relation of mores to morality, ethos is the basis of the term ethics, while nomos gives the suffix -onomy, as in astronomy.

== Anthropology ==
The meaning of all these terms extend to all customs of proper behavior in a given society, both religious and profane, from more trivial conventional aspects of custom, etiquette or politeness—"folkways" enforced by gentle social pressure, but going beyond mere "folkways" or conventions in including moral codes and notions of justice—down to strict taboos, behavior that is unthinkable within the society in question, very commonly including incest and murder, but also the commitment of outrages specific to the individual society such as blasphemy. Such religious or sacral customs may vary. Some examples include funerary services, matrimonial services; circumcision and covering of the hair in Judaism, Christian Ten Commandments, New Commandment and the sacraments or for example baptism, and Protestant work ethic, Shahada, prayer, alms, the fast and the pilgrimage as well as modesty in Islam, and religious diet.

While cultural universals are by definition part of the mores of every society (hence also called "empty universals"), the customary norms specific to a given society are a defining aspect of the cultural identity of an ethnicity or a nation. Coping with the differences between two sets of cultural conventions is a matter of intercultural competence.

Differences in the mores of various nations are at the root of ethnic stereotype, or in the case of reflection upon one's own mores, autostereotypes.

The customary norms in a given society may include indigenous land rights, honour, filial piety, customary law and the customary international law that affects countries who may not have codified their customary norms. Land rights of indigenous peoples is under customary land tenure, its a system of arrangement in-line with customs and norms. This is the case in colonies. An example of a norm is a culture of honor exists in some societies, where the family is viewed as the main source of honor and the conduct of family members reflects upon their family honor. For instance some writers say in Rome to have an honorable stance, to be equals with someone, existed for those who are most similar to one another (family and friends) this could be due to the competing for public recognition and therefore for personal and public honor, over rhetoric, sport, war, wealth and virtue. To protrude, stand out, be recognized and demonstrate this "A Roman could win such a "competition" by pointing to past evidences of their honor" and "Or, a critic might be refuted by one's performance in a fresh showdown in which one's bona fides could be plainly demonstrated." Honor culture only can exist if the society has for males the shared code, a standard to uphold, guidelines and rules to follow, do not want to break those rules and how to interact successfully and to engage, this exists within a "closed" community of equals.

Filial piety is ethics towards one's family, as Fung Yu-lan states "the ideological basis for traditional [Chinese] society" and according to Confucious repay a burden debt back to ones parents or caregiver but its also traditional in another sense so as to fulfill an obligation to ones own ancestors, also to modern scholars it suggests extends an attitude of respect to superiors also, who are deserving to have that respect.

== See also ==
- Culture-bound syndrome
- Enculturation
- Euthyphro dilemma, discussing the conflict of sacral and secular mores
- Habitus (sociology)
- Nihonjinron "Japanese mores"
- Piety
- Political and Moral Sociology: see Luc Boltanski and French Pragmatism
- Repugnancy costs
- Value (personal and cultural)
