= You have two cows =

Joke pattern pertaining to different economic systems

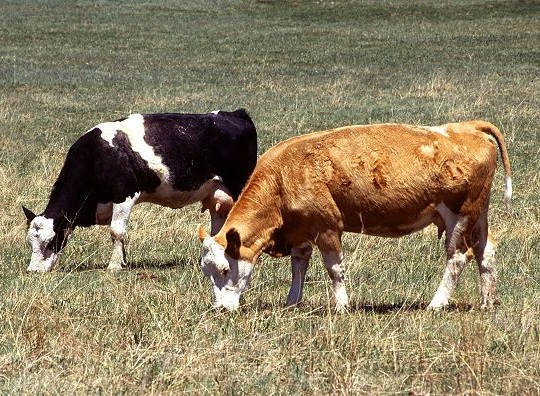
Various scenarios involving two cows have been used as metaphors in economic satire.

"You have two cows" is a political analogy and form of early 20th-century American political satire to describe various economic systems of government. The setup of a typical joke of this kind is the assumption that the listener lives within a given system and has two cows. The punch line is what happens to the listener and the cows in the system; it offers a brief and humorous take on the subject or locale.

== History ==
A 1936 article in The Modern Language Journal reports that the following definitions of "isms" were used in a Chicago political campaign:

- Socialism: If you have two cows, you give one to your neighbor.
- Communism: If you have two cows, you give them to the government and the government then gives you some milk.
- Fascism: If you have two cows, you keep the cows and give the milk to the government; then the government sells you some milk.
- New Dealism: If you have two cows, you shoot one and milk the other; then you pour the milk down the drain.
- Nazism: If you have two cows, the government shoots you and keeps the cows.
- Capitalism: If you have two cows, you sell one and buy a bull.

Bill Sherk mentions that such lists circulated throughout the United States since around 1936 under the title "Parable of the Isms". A column in The Chicago Daily Tribune in 1938 attributes a version involving socialism, communism, fascism and New Dealism (Note: New Dealism: You have two cows. The government takes both, shoots one, buys milk from the other cow, then pours the milk down the drain. — Cited in: Lisgar Collegiate Institute. Vox Lycei 1939-1940. Lisgar Alumni Association. p. 71.) to an address by Silas Strawn to the Economic Club of Chicago on 29 November 1935.

Richard M Steers and Luciara Nardon in their book about global economy use the "two cows" metaphor to illustrate the concept of cultural differences. They write that jokes of this kind, "Russian company: You have two cows. You drink some vodka and count them again. You have five cows. The Russian Mafia shows up and takes however many cows you have", are considered funny because they are "realistic but exaggerated caricatures" of various cultures, and the pervasiveness of such jokes stems from the significant cultural differences. Steers and Nardon also state that others believe such jokes present cultural stereotypes and must be viewed with caution.

=== Enron variant ===
The economics of the Enron scandal have been a target of the "two cows" joke, often describing the accounting fraud that took place in Enron's finances. Much of the beginning of the joke when used to describe Enron resembles the following:

Enronism: You have two cows. You sell three of them to your publicly listed company, using letters of credit opened by your brother-in-law at the bank, then execute a debt/equity swap with an associated general offer so that you get all four cows back, with a tax exemption for five cows. The milk rights of the six cows are transferred via an intermediary to a Cayman Island company secretly owned by your CFO who sells the rights to all seven cows back to your listed company. The annual report says the company owns eight cows, with an option on six more.

The ending of the joke varies in most interactions. An article by Bruce Sterling for the magazine Wired in 2008 had a version of the joke ending with Enron selling one cow to buy a new president of the United States, no balance sheet provided with the annual report, and ultimately the public buying Enron's bull. In 2002, Power Engineering ended the joke by announcing Enron would start trading cows online using the platform COW (cows on web).
