= Stereotypes of British people =

Portrayal of the people of Britain in other cultures

Stereotypes of British people are found in several cultures. Some stereotypes relate to many specific ethnic groups of Britain while others are directed at British nationals in general.

== Positive ==
=== Politeness and charm ===
Both historically and in the present day, the British have often been associated with good manners by many people around the world. There is a widely held belief in the concept of a "fancy British man" who is charming, suave, and well-dressed with an attractive accent. Perhaps the most famous fictional example of this is James Bond, with the stereotype being bolstered by other fictional characters such as Lucifer Morningstar. There is also a preference for American media (usually Hollywood films) to portray villains as British, with some studies suggesting that the British accent unconsciously leads audiences to believe the character possesses superior intelligence, thus making it easier to buy into the idea that the character's evil plan is plausible. The English actor Alan Rickman garnered a reputation as Hollywood's favourite villain during his career.

=== Queueing ===
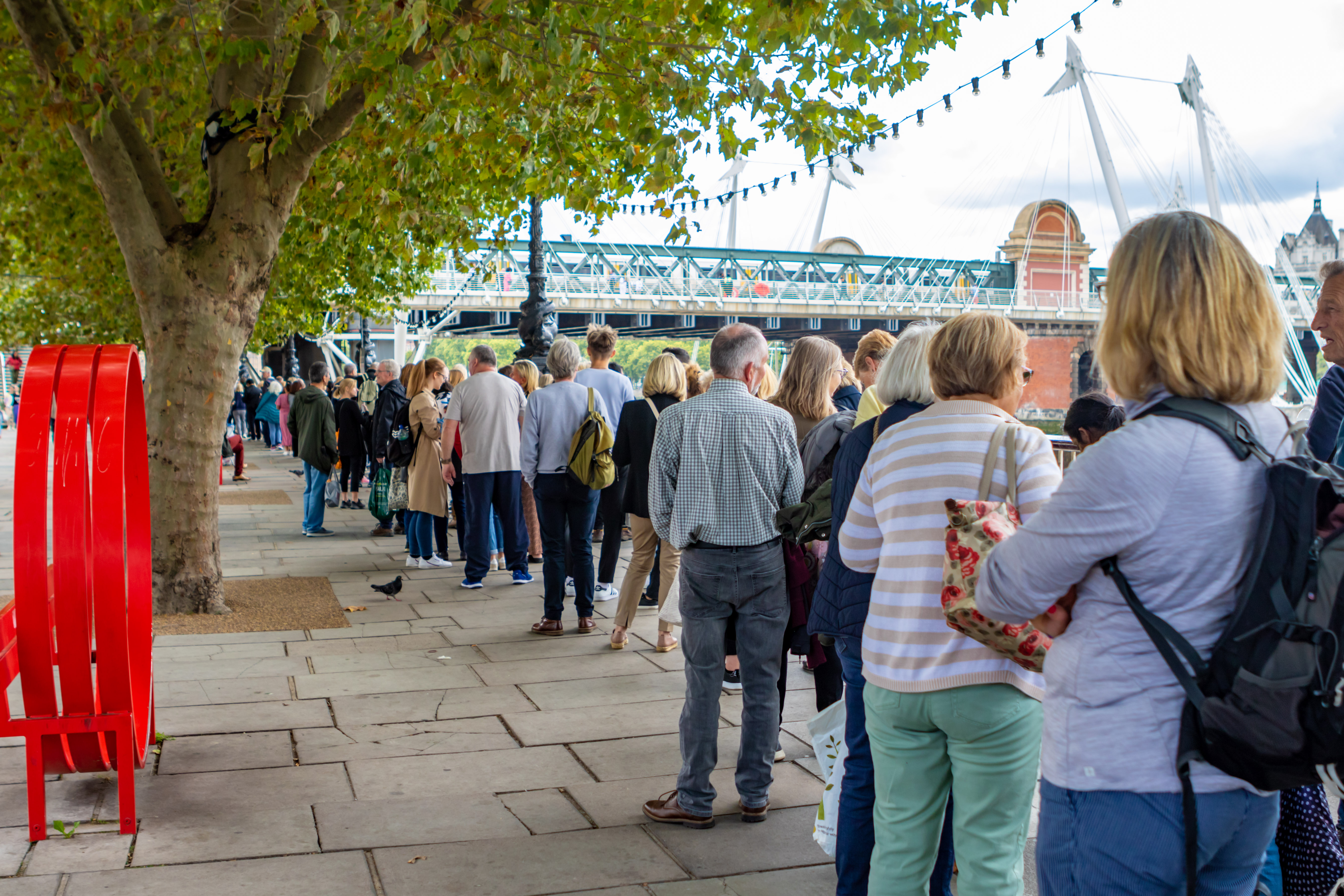
London's queue for the lying-in-state of Elizabeth II

The act of queueing holds a significant place in British culture and is often viewed as a quintessential British activity. Historically rooted in the British values of fairness, orderliness, and respect for social norms, not only is the adherence to queues seen in day-to-day activities such as waiting for public transport or purchasing goods in a shop, but it also symbolises deeper cultural ideals about patience and propriety.

This penchant for forming and respecting queues has become a commonly referenced stereotype in both domestic and international media. While some scholars and commentators argue that the stereotype may be exaggerated, it remains an enduring symbol of British cultural identity. It has also been a source of self-deprecating jokes, with the British often acknowledging their habit of forming orderly lines even in the most informal settings. The social implications of queue-jumping are profound in Britain, and such actions are often met with silent disapproval, tutting or direct confrontation, underlining the cultural importance of this unspoken rule.

In pubs, the British have traditionally waited standing laterally along the width of the bar, to be served at the bar staff's leisure. Starting in the mid-2020s, some pub owners reported a trend, especially amongst younger drinkers, towards queuing in a single file line.

=== Sense of humour ===
British humour is well known for its use of absurdity, awkwardness, dark comedy, self-deprecation, dry comedy, innuendo, irony, sarcasm, satire, wit and word play. Monty Python was a famous British comedy troupe, and some of the most highly regarded comedies worldwide, such as Fawlty Towers and Mr. Bean, are British. Banter and mocking in a friendly manner are commonplace in British culture. Making fun of one another is considered a form of bonding, particularly in working-class environments.

=== Stoic nature ===
The British are often seen as reserved and unemotional, but in a pragmatic sense rather than an overtly negative one. This perspective has been bolstered by numerous popular British phrases such as "stiff upper lip", which means displaying an emotionless and determined exterior in the face of hardship; "keep calm and carry on", which was taken from a motivational poster produced by the British government in preparation for the Second World War; and "always look on the bright side of life", a popular Monty Python comedy song about persevering in the direst situations.

=== Pluckiness ===
British athletes are stereotypically described as "plucky", meaning brave and determined, especially when success is unlikely. The term is used in popular culture. Success in the 2012 Summer Olympics challenged the stereotype of the British plucky loser. The cyclist Chris Hoy stated, "I think the Brits historically have got used to being the plucky losers. The attitude has been we'll support our lads and our lasses but we don't expect them to win anything. The teams go to the world cup in football and there are the usual tales of woe – losing penalty shoot-outs. It's like inevitable that the Brits are going to get beaten at some point. But I think that's there's a change in that culture in sport."

=== Tea ===
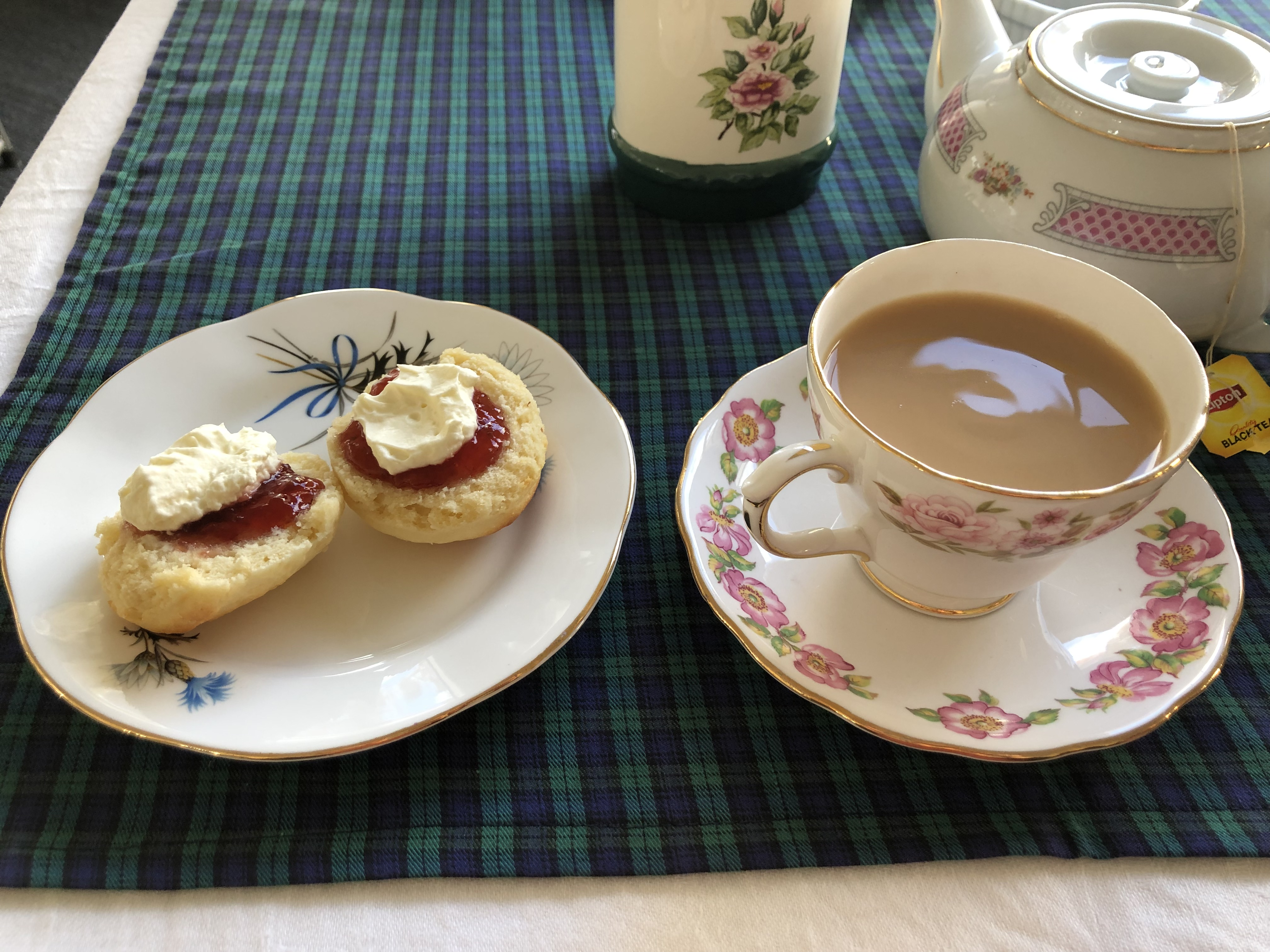
Tea and scones

Drinking tea, specifically black tea, is seen as a key part of British culture. Originally introduced as a luxury product in the 17th century, cheap imports from colonial India allowed its consumption to increase significantly during the second half of the 19th century.

Surveys in 2017 showed that Britain had the 12th-largest tea consumption per capita in the world, and that almost 75 per cent of Britons who drank tea daily had at least two cups a day. Other hot drinks, especially coffee, have become as popular as tea.

== Negative ==
=== Anti-social behaviour abroad ===
In Spain, Greece, Latvia and Malaysia, British tourists have been associated with antisocial and violent behaviour in some countries, sometimes related to binge drinking. Barcelona blamed British tourism for an 18.5 per cent rise in complaints to police from 2015 to 2016, with offences including street drinking and public nudity. Amsterdam launched a tourism campaign in 2023 discouraging British tourists from antisocial behaviour, following years of complaints from locals about public urination and drunken fights.

Similarly to Americans and other English-speaking nationalities, British tourists have also been stereotyped as preferring to shout and talk slower in English when interacting with foreigners instead of making an effort to learn phrases in the local language.

=== Food ===
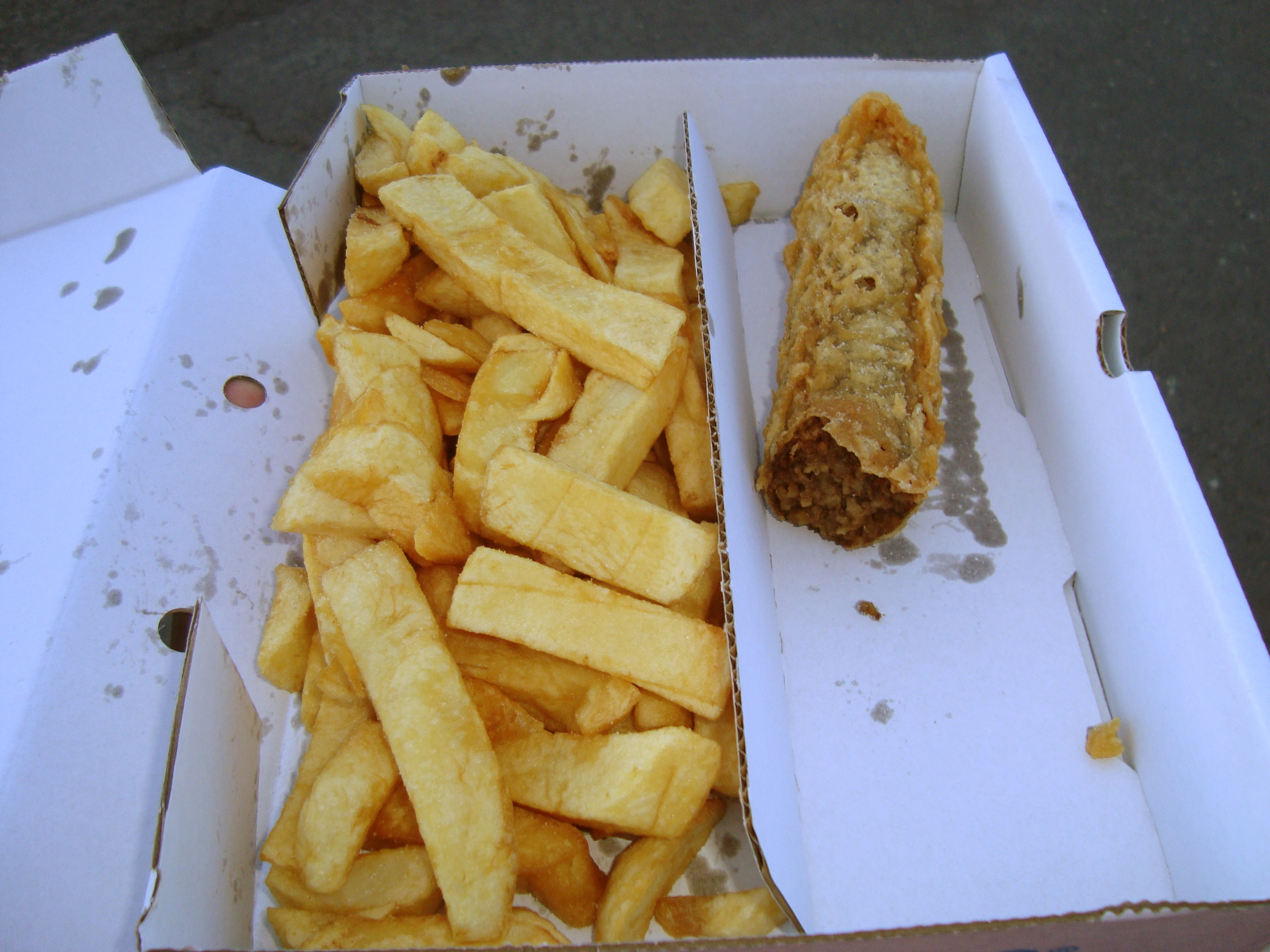
A haggis supper, a popular dish in Scotland

Jokes are often told about British food being either low-quality or inedible, with particular attention paid to dishes with unusual names (such as spotted dick, rumbledethumps, or bubble and squeak). While the image of British cuisine being bland was first formed in the post-Second World War period (largely due to rationing), British cuisine is generally viewed positively as a good example of 'comfort' food; additionally, globalisation and immigration has made food more diverse; in modern times, lists of the most popular cuisines in the United Kingdom usually include imported cuisines such as Chinese, Indian, Italian, Spanish, French, Japanese, Mexican and Brazilian.

=== Football hooliganism ===
Football hooliganism has a worldwide association with Britain; so much so that it is often dubbed the "British" or "English disease". In 1985, the prime minister, Margaret Thatcher, established a "war cabinet" to combat football hooliganism. Football hooliganism has been linked to such events such as the Heysel Stadium disaster. However, the British government has led a widespread crackdown on football-related violence since the 1980s, and British football fans now have a better reputation abroad. At the forefront of English football violence in Europe was West Ham United's Inter City Firm, who became well known for their strategy of steaming foreign home supporters out of their own ends and trying to dismantle the stadium.

=== Monolingualism ===
There is a common stereotype that the British are only able to speak English. This has some truth to it, as levels of bilingualism amongst them are relatively low, but this is also the case in the majority of English-speaking countries. Additionally, the number of people who speak a language other than English as their first language is reasonably low, especially among those who were born in the United Kingdom—even among those with immediate immigrant ancestry. However, British schoolchildren receive compulsory lessons in one or more of French, German, Spanish and other modern languages. This used to happen during the first years of secondary school, but teaching foreign languages at an earlier age has been viewed as increasingly important.

=== Teeth ===
Americans often joke about the British having bad teeth. This stereotype appears to stem from a particularly American view of dental health in which artificially straightened and whitened teeth (sometimes referred to as "Hollywood teeth") are the healthiest, but this primarily affects only the outer appearance of teeth and some evidence has shown that artificial whitening actually has a negative effect on dental health. A report by the World Health Organization from 2000 on the dental health of 12-year-old children had the UK scoring only slightly higher than the US on the decay-missing-filled index, with an average of 1.4-1.5 decayed, missing or filled teeth per child in the United Kingdom, compared to 1.4 in the United States. Additionally, modern reports consistently rank British teeth as healthier (if only slightly) than American teeth for adults.

Jokes about British teeth appear in American popular culture. In "Last Exit to Springfield", an episode of the American animated sitcom The Simpsons, a strict dentist scares Ralph Wiggum into brushing his teeth by showing him a fictional book titled The Big Book of British Smiles that depicts a Queen's Guard member and Charles, Prince of Wales, with exaggeratedly crooked teeth. A Rimmel cosmetics television advertisement featuring the English fashion model Georgia May Jagger became an internet meme in 2014. In the advertisement, Jagger says "get the London look" and viewers ultimately associated the "London look" with the gap between her front teeth.

=== Unrelenting negativity ===
British immigrants to Australia are sometimes called "whinging poms", meaning moaning English people.

=== Weather ===
British weather is often associated with rain and fog, although London's reputation for foggy weather dates from before the passing of the Clean Air Act 1956, which was brought in after the Great Smog of London in 1952.

British people are often stereotyped for frequently discussing the weather. A study in 2010 found that 94 per cent of British respondents said they had discussed the weather in the previous six hours. British weather is noted for its unpredictability, and historically, with the United Kingdom's agrarian roots, the weather was important for farmers, making it a staple topic of discussion. Over time, this frequent dialogue about weather has evolved into both an ice-breaker and a cultural touchpoint, sidestepping potentially controversial subjects and fostering communal connections.

This cultural phenomenon is reflected in various aspects of British culture, from literature and art riddled with references to rain and fog to traditional attire like trench coats and Wellington boots, which are tailored to combat the unpredictable British weather.

== See also ==
- Anti-British sentiment
- An Englishman, an Irishman and a Scotsman
- Nation of shopkeepers
