= Stereotypes of groups within the United States =

There are stereotypes of various groups of people which live within the United States and contribute to its culture. Worldwide, a disproportionately high number of people know about these stereotypes, due to the transmission of American culture and values via the exportation of American-made films and television shows.

The United States has a population of nearly 340,000,000, and as a result of the presence of such a large population, there are different ethnic groups within the nation and each of them brings its own culture, beliefs and traditions with it. The United States formally recognizes five racial categories and it also lists them on the US census. Those five racial categories are White, Black/African American, American Indian/Alaska Native, Asian, and Native Hawaiian/Other Pacific Islander. However, within these five racial categories, there are additional subgroups and each of them has unique cultural characteristics which separate them from other subgroups. For instance, Indian Americans have a culture which is different from the culture of Korean Americans, despite the fact that Indian Americans and Korean Americans are both considered Asian Americans. Due to the presence of many different cultures and groups within the United States, stereotypes of those groups have been developed. A stereotype is a widely held but fixed and oversimplified image or idea of a particular type of person or thing. Throughout the history of the United States, stereotypes have been prevalent and have had a major impact on the ethnic groups in the country.

== Ethnic groups ==
=== Native Americans and Alaskan Natives ===
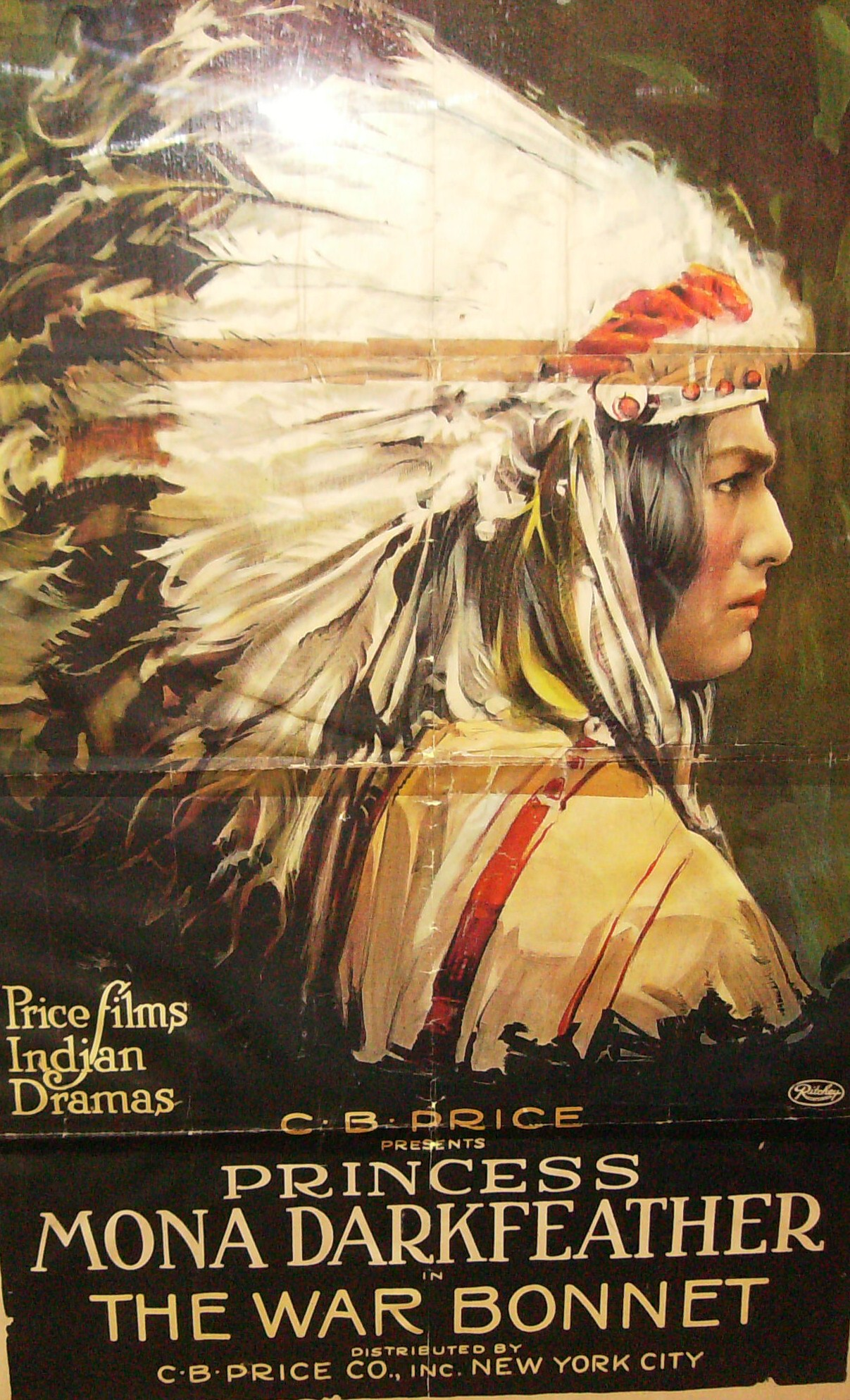
The War Bonnet (1914) starring Mona Darkfeather, who was not Native American

There has long been admiration for Native Americans as people who fit the archetype of the noble savage within European thought, stemming from a cultural sympathy which is grounded within the post-Enlightenment theory of primitivism. These positive portrayals of Native Americans as being noble, peaceful people, who lived in harmony with nature and each other continue within modern culture, e.g. the film Dances with Wolves (1990).

Over time, as settlers spread west, Native Americans were seen as obstacles and the image of them became more negative. In popular media, Native Americans were portrayed as wild, primitive, uncivilized and dangerous people who continuously attacked white settlers, cowboys, and stagecoaches and ululated while they held one hand in front of their mouths. They invariably spoke in a deep voice and they also used stop words like "How" and "Ugh".

In drawings, their skin color was depicted as being deep red. In westerns and other media portrayals, they are usually called "Indians". Examples of this stereotypical image of Native Americans can be found in many American westerns which were produced before the early 1960s, and they are also found in cartoons such as Peter Pan. In other stereotypes, they smoked peace pipes, wore face paint, danced around totem poles (hostages were frequently tied to them), sent smoke signals, lived in tepees, wore feathered head-dresses, scalped their foes, and said 'um' instead of 'the' or 'a'.

As colonization continued in the United States, groups were separated into opposing categories such as "Christians" and "civilized" and "heathen" and "savage". Many Whites have viewed Native Americans as people who are devoid of self-control and unable to handle responsibility. Modern Native Americans as they live today are rarely portrayed in popular culture.

Native Americans were also portrayed as all-bring fierce warrior braves—often appearing in school sports teams' names until such team names fell into disfavor in the later 20th century. Many school team names have been revised to reflect current sensibilities, though professional teams like the Kansas City Chiefs and the Atlanta Braves continue. Some controversial upper-level Native American team mascots such as Chief Noc-A-Homa and Chief Illiniwek have been discontinued; others like Chief Osceola and Renegade remain.

Native American gaming has been expanding since the 1970s, and was formalized in the Indian Gaming Regulatory Act. It has become a modern stereotype that a Native American must either own a casino or be in the family of one who does.

=== African Americans ===
==== Historical stereotypes ====
Both before and during the first half of the 20th century, whites frequently depicted black people as dumb, evil, lazy, poor, cannibalistic, smelly, uncivilized, un-Christian people. White Americans sometimes believed that black people were inferior to white people. These thoughts helped to justify black slavery and the institution of many laws that continually condoned inhumane treatment and perpetuated to keep black people in a lower socioeconomic position. This was especially true for how whites treated black females, often labeling them with lewd adjectives. This became known as the Jezebel stereotype, after the infamous Phoenician Queen Jezebel. The Jezebel stereotype was used during the slave era to describe a black woman who had sexual relations with a white man.

Black people were usually depicted as slaves or servants who worked in cane fields or carried large piles of cotton. They were frequently portrayed as devout Christians who went to church and sang gospel music. In many vaudeville shows, minstrel acts, cartoons, comics and animated cartoons of that period, they were depicted as sad, lazy, dimwitted characters with big lips who sang bluesy songs and were good dancers, but they got excited whenever they were confronted with dice games, chickens or watermelons (examples: all of the characters who were portrayed by Stepin Fetchit and black characters in cartoons like "Sunday Go to Meetin' Time" and "All This and Rabbit Stew").

A more joyful black image, yet still very stereotypical, was provided by eternally happy black characters like Uncle Tom, Uncle Remus and Louis Armstrong's equally joyous stage persona. Another popular stereotype from this era was the black who is scared of ghosts (and usually turns white out of fear). Children are often pickaninnies like Little Black Sambo and Golliwog. African-American Vernacular English speech was also often used in comedy, like for instance in the sitcom Amos 'n' Andy.

Another stereotype was that of the savage. African black people were usually depicted as primitive, childlike, cannibalistic persons who live in tribes, carry spears, believe in witchcraft and worship their wizard.

==== Modern stereotypes ====
Since the 1960s, the stereotypical image of black people has changed in some media. More positive depictions appeared where black people and African Americans are portrayed as great athletes and superb singers and dancers. In many films and television series since the 1970s, black people are depicted as good-natured, kind, honest and intelligent persons. Often they are the best friend of the white protagonist (examples: Miami Vice, Lethal Weapon, Magnum Force, Walker, Texas Ranger, The Incredibles).

Some critics believed this political correctness led to another stereotypical image where black people are often depicted too positively. Spike Lee popularized the term magical negro, deriding the archetype of the "super-duper magical negro" in 2001 while discussing films with students at Washington State University and at Yale University.

==== Criminals ====
African Americans have been the subject of stereotyping and racism for centuries, stereotypes of African Americans have continued to be prevalent in wider society. One of the most common stereotypes is that of African Americans as violent criminals. This is a stereotype that has been documented by social psychologists for decades and continues to be relevant to our modern society. Proponents of this stereotype will cite statistics like the one released by the FBI that states in 2015, 51.1% of those arrested for homicide were African American, despite African American people only accounting for 13.4% of the total United States population. This has raised some rebuttals against the validity of the statement such as the fact that it doesn't take into account African Americans acquitted, of which 47% of exonerations since 2016 have been of African Americans. As a result of this stereotype African Americans are 5 times more likely to be stopped without just cause by the police than their white counterparts. Evidence of this stereotype can be seen in New York City's "Stop and Frisk" policy, which has since been deemed unconstitutional. However, during its legality between 2004 and 2012 over 4.4 million people were stopped, of those 4.4 million, 80% were black and Latino residents.

==== Drug addicts ====
A similar stereotype of African Americans as drug addicts emerged after President Nixon launched the "war on drugs". The effort to fight this war on drugs was later emboldened by President Reagan. This led to new laws being implemented, such as minimum sentences for different drug uses. One significant difference in mandatory sentences was between crack cocaine and powder cocaine. While only 5 grams of crack was enough for a 5 year sentence, 500 grams of powder cocaine was necessary for a 5 year sentence. This is despite the fact that crack and powder are nearly identical with no pharmaceutical difference. One big difference between the two drugs is that African Americans were more likely to use crack in their lifetime than white people, whereas racial minorities are at less risk of powder cocaine use. This led to more African Americans being sentenced and sent to prison, with nearly 81% of convicted crack users being Black. The war on drugs reinforced the stereotype of African Americans as drug users and crack addicts, when in reality, young white adults were found to be more likely to have used illicit drugs than black young adults.

==== Athletes ====
While the stereotype of African Americans as criminals continues to persist in our society, there are other stereotypes of African Americans such as athletes and/or hip hop stars. Black athletes are often noted for having a "natural ability" and are stereotyped as being physical specimens. This myth has become more prevalent in the wake of statistics showing African Americans comprising 71.8% of the National Basketball Association and 57.5% of the National Football League, as of 2022. In an attempt to rationalize black excellence and success in these fields, stereotypes about black people being physically gifted arose. This stereotype has been used to undermine the success of Black athletes, attributing their success to an ability that they innately have and shifting the focus away from the hard work they put in. Additionally this stereotype implies that while Black athletes rely on their "natural ability," their white counterparts rely on intellect instead, an untrue belief stemming from this stereotype.

=== Hispanic and Latino Americans ===
==== Job stealers ====
Stereotypes of Latin Americans largely stem from the negative sentiment surrounding immigration, and the stereotype that Latin Americans come to the United States illegally. A common stereotype is the belief that Hispanics are "stealing jobs". This is a stereotype that directly came from the anti-immigration sentiment and was fueled by politicians such as U.S. president Donald Trump, who said, "They're taking our jobs. They're taking our manufacturing jobs. They're taking our money. They're killing us." While Hispanics and Latino men have the highest labor force participation rates of any demographic in the United States. A poll by the Pew Research Center found that 77% of adults believe that undocumented immigrants mostly fill jobs U.S. citizens do not want. Specifically among Hispanics, 88% say undocumented immigrants mostly fill jobs U.S. citizens do not want.

==== Lazy ====
Hispanic and Latino Americans have also been stereotyped as being lazy and irresponsible. This claim has been around for over 100 years; in 1879, the New York Times referred to "Lazy Mexicans" in a headline. This claim continues to be used by political pundits such as conservative commentator Ann Coulter, who claimed it was a waste of time to try and get Latinos to vote because they are lazy. This claim has been largely debunked. The Organization for Economic Cooperation and Development found that on average, Mexicans worked 2,246 hours in 2015, exceeding all other countries involved in the study, including the average American, who worked 1,790 hours in 2015. Additionally Hispanic men were found more likely to participate in the workforce than whites in the United States.

==== Criminals ====
Latin American men are typically stereotyped as being violent and criminals, a stereotype that is reinforced in English speaking television shows in the United States. One prominent example is the show "Breaking Bad"; many of the drug dealers and gang members in the show are of Hispanic heritage and are referred to in derogatory terms such as "beaner", a slur against Mexicans.

==== Stereotypes of Latinas ====
Latinas, or Latin American women, are often stereotyped in popular culture as housekeepers or maids and are hypersexualized. An example is the movie Maid in Manhattan (2002), which features a Hispanic maid, portrayed by Jennifer Lopez, as one of the main characters. The media also often portray Latinas in a sexual manner, consistently showing them in tight fitting, revealing clothes. An example is the sitcom Modern Family, in which a character played by Sofia Vergara consistently wears revealing clothes and high heels and is hotheaded. The media in American society has continued to push an image of Latinas as sexually attractive, with voluptuous figures and wearing revealing clothing.

=== Asian Americans ===
Due to the vast amount of subgroups within Asia, numerous stereotypes have been created as a result of the immigration to America by members of those different groups. However, there are some similarities in the types of stereotypes which have been applied to members of different groups, namely, the "model minority." According to this stereotype, Asian Americans are naturally smart, particularly in math and the sciences, wealthy, and hard-working/self reliant. Those generalizations seek to erase the disparities within the Asian American community, while also being weaponized against other minorities for not living up to those standards. There are major disparities in income between different Asian ethnic groups, with Burmese Americans earning an average of $44,400 a year, whereas Indian Americans average $119,000 a year. This stereotype of Asian Americans is used as a tool to sow divide between different minority groups in America. It does this by downplaying the effects of racism on other minority communities, especially Black Americans. People who perpetuate the model minority myth believe that the different forms of racism which have been experienced by Asian Americans and Black Americans are really the same form of racism, and since Asian Americans have been more successful than African Americans, African Americans are blamed for not experiencing a similar level of success. This myth conflates the different types of racism that minority groups experience so it can be used to put down less successful minority groups which have experienced a great deal of systemic racism.

==== South Asian Americans ====
South Asians are often clumped together and stereotyped as all being from India, one of the biggest South Asian countries, despite the hundreds of millions of people living in neighboring nations. South Asians are often depicted as being "nerdy", with a knowledge for computers and science and having thick accents. This stereotype is reinforced through TV shows such as Phineas and Ferb, which included the character Baljeet, a south Asian who fills the role of a nerdy kid who is obsessed with grades; and the show Jessie, which had a character named Ravi, who was depicted as being a nerd. In both instances the characters have very thick accents.

Another popular stereotype is that South Asians (especially Indians) frequently work in call centers and convenience stores, the latter being popularized by The Simpsons character Apu.

==== East and Southeast Asian Americans ====
In addition to the model minority stereotype, others include the stereotype of East Asian women as docile or submissive. This holds Asian women back from attaining leadership positions in the workforce due to the belief they would not be capable of such positions. East Asian women are also stereotyped as sexual objects and oversexualized. This stereotype stems from laws in the US that barred the importation of Asian women for sexual purposes, thus assuming that Asian women are inherently sexual. A more recent stereotype is that East Asian Americans are infected with the COVID-19 virus or brought the virus to the US. This stereotype started when the virus was discovered to have originated in China, and was referred to as the "China Virus" by President Donald Trump. This resulted in an increase in anti-Asian hate crimes and violence against Asian Americans.

=== Middle Eastern Americans ===
==== Arabs Americans ====
Arabs refer to people who originate from the Middle East. A common stereotype is the assumption that Arabs are therefore automatically Muslim. While there are many Arab Muslims, there are also thousands of Arab Jews and millions of Arab Christians. The September 11 attacks popularized the stereotype of the highly radicalized, violent Arab. Additionally, news broadcasts will typically cover what they call "Islamic Terrorism", correlating Islam with terror. This belief persists despite most Muslims condemning violence.

==== Jewish Americans ====
Jews in the United States have been subjected to many stereotypes, both positive and negative, and have faced relatively little discrimination compared to Jews in Europe. Jewish Americans are associated with charity, philanthropy and being adept at doing business, but also with negative attributes related to entrepreneurship, primarily greed, corporatism and power. Jewish Americans have also been associated with supporting Israel and the country's policies towards Palestinians and the Middle East, although an increasing amount of Jewish Americans show little to no support for Israel's policies.

== See also ==
- Ethnic stereotype
- Stereotype
- Stereotypes of Americans
- Stereotypes of Asians
- Stereotypes of Jews
