= American lean =

Informal term for a perceived American posture stereotype

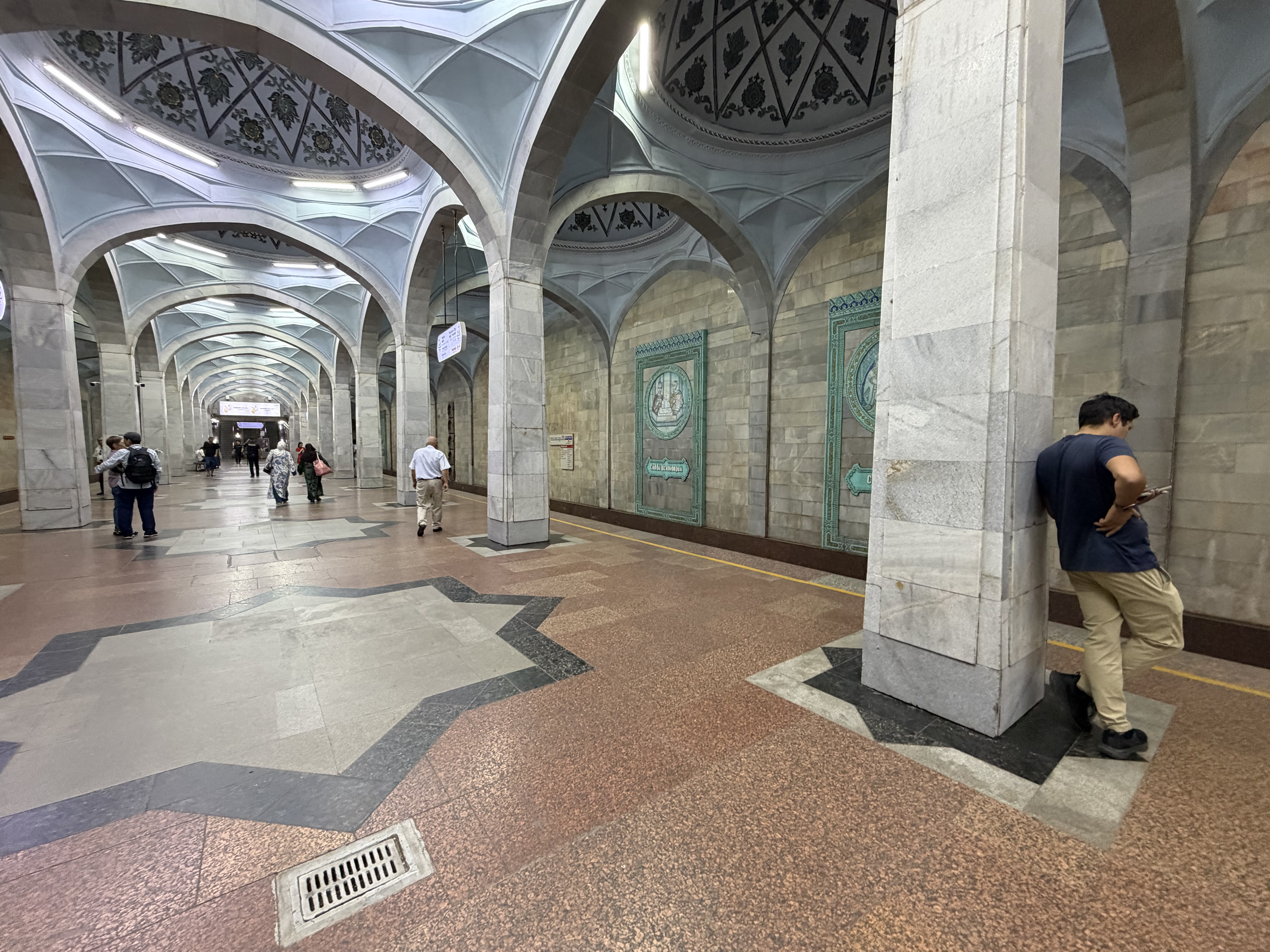
American man leaning against a pillar in Tashkent, Uzbekistan

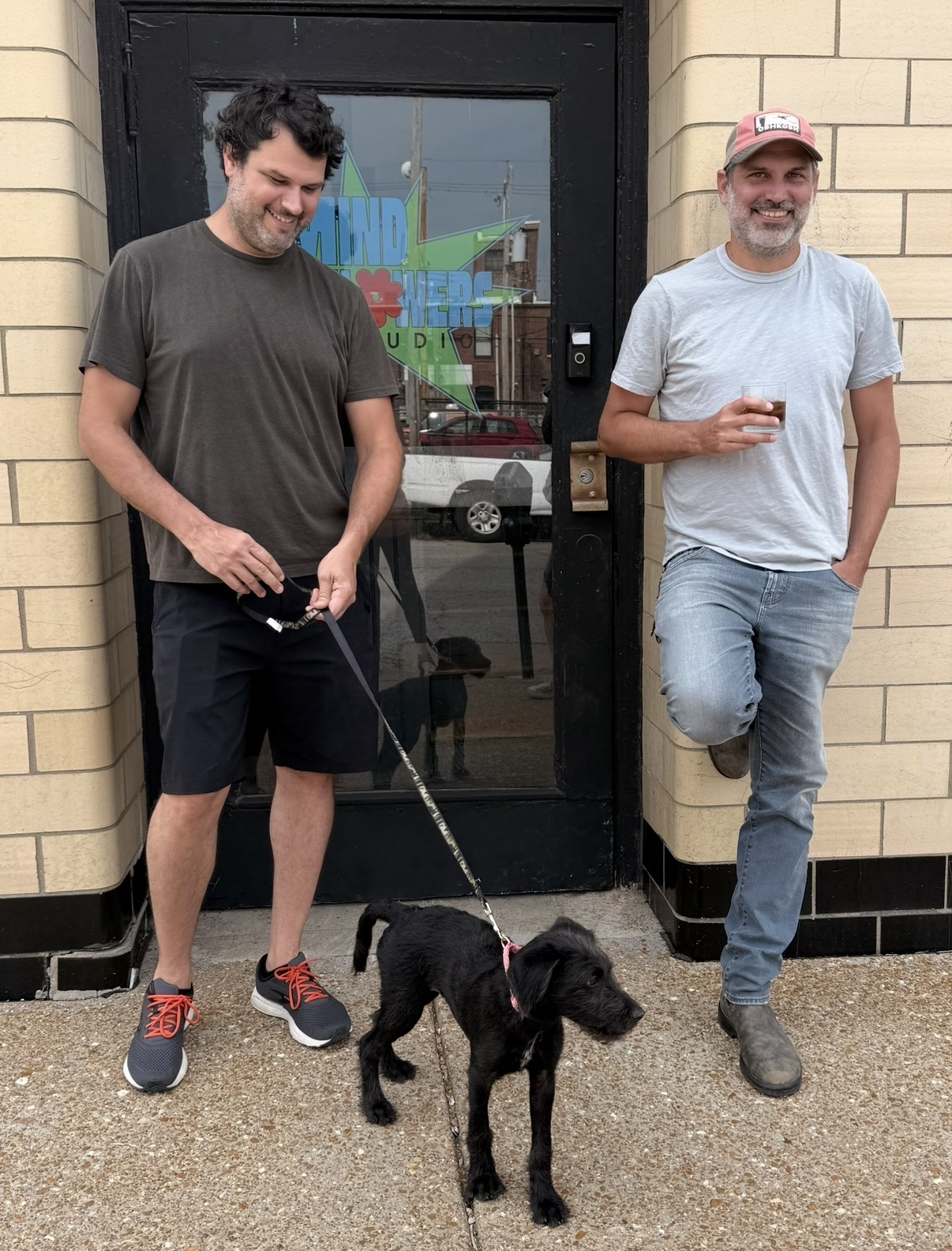
Two men, one leaning, and a dog in front of a building in the United States

American lean is an informal term for a perceived tendency of Americans to stand with their weight on one foot or to lean against nearby objects while waiting in public. The expression is often in the context of cultural stereotypes about American tourists. According to a former Central Intelligence Agency chief of disguise, Jonna Mendez, field assets are trained not to stand in this manner. The American lean has no scientific basis and is a theory that has been circulated online. All links in the respective post come back to one person and reference each other and social media posts, starting in 2020.

The American lean occurs on objects such as railings, walls, doorways, or benches. Other cultures tend to stand more upright and centered, particularly in narrower public spaces. It is speculated that this phenomenon is associated with relaxed American body language that has been shaped by wide sidewalks, open spaces, and informal public behavior.The posture has also been described as a recognizable characteristic of Americans abroad, alongside other perceived cultural traits such as speaking loudly.American standards of posture have reportedly become more relaxed over time.

In the mid 2020s, the phenomenon gained attention on social media.

== See also ==
- Body language
- Contrapposto
- Stereotypes of Americans
