= Stereotypes of Jews =

Generalized representations of Jewish people

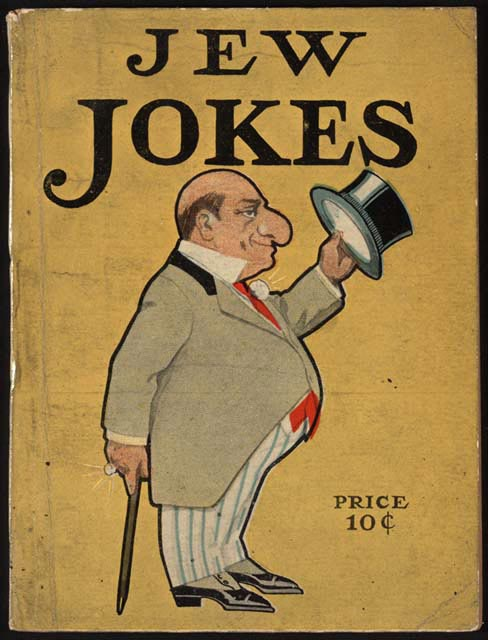
The cover of the 1908 Little Giant publication Jew Jokes, which displays the stereotypical physical caricature of a Jewish man

Stereotypes of Jews are generalized representations of Jews, often caricatured, prejudiced and sometimes of an antisemitic nature.

Reproduced common objects, phrases, and traditions are used to emphasize or ridicule Jewishness. This includes the complaining and guilt-inflicting Jewish mother, often along with a meek nice Jewish boy, and the spoiled and materialistic Jewish-American princess.

== Stereotype by type ==
=== Physical features ===
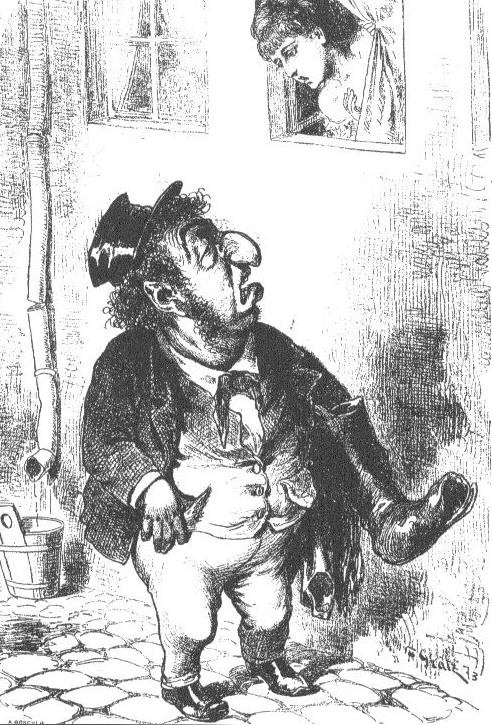
An 1873 caricature featuring stereotypical physical traits of a Jew

In caricatures and cartoons, Ashkenazi Jews are usually depicted as having large hook-noses and dark beady eyes with drooping eyelids. Exaggerated or grotesque Jewish facial features were a staple theme in Nazi propaganda. The Star Wars character Watto, introduced in The Phantom Menace (1999), has been likened to traditional antisemitic caricatures.

==== Nose ====
The idea of the large or aquiline "Jewish nose" remains one of the most prevalent and defining features to characterize someone as a Jew. This widespread stereotype can be traced back to the 13th century, according to art historian Sara Lipton. While the depiction of the hooked-nose originated in the 13th century, it had an uprooting in European imagery many centuries later. The earliest record of anti-Jewish caricature is a detailed doodle depicted in the upper margin of the Exchequer Receipt Roll (English royal tax record) in 1233. It shows three demented-looking Jews inside a castle as well as a Jew in the middle of the castle with a large nose. The satirical antisemitic 1893 book The Operated Jew revolves around a plot of cosmetic surgery as a "cure" for Jewishness.

==== Hair ====
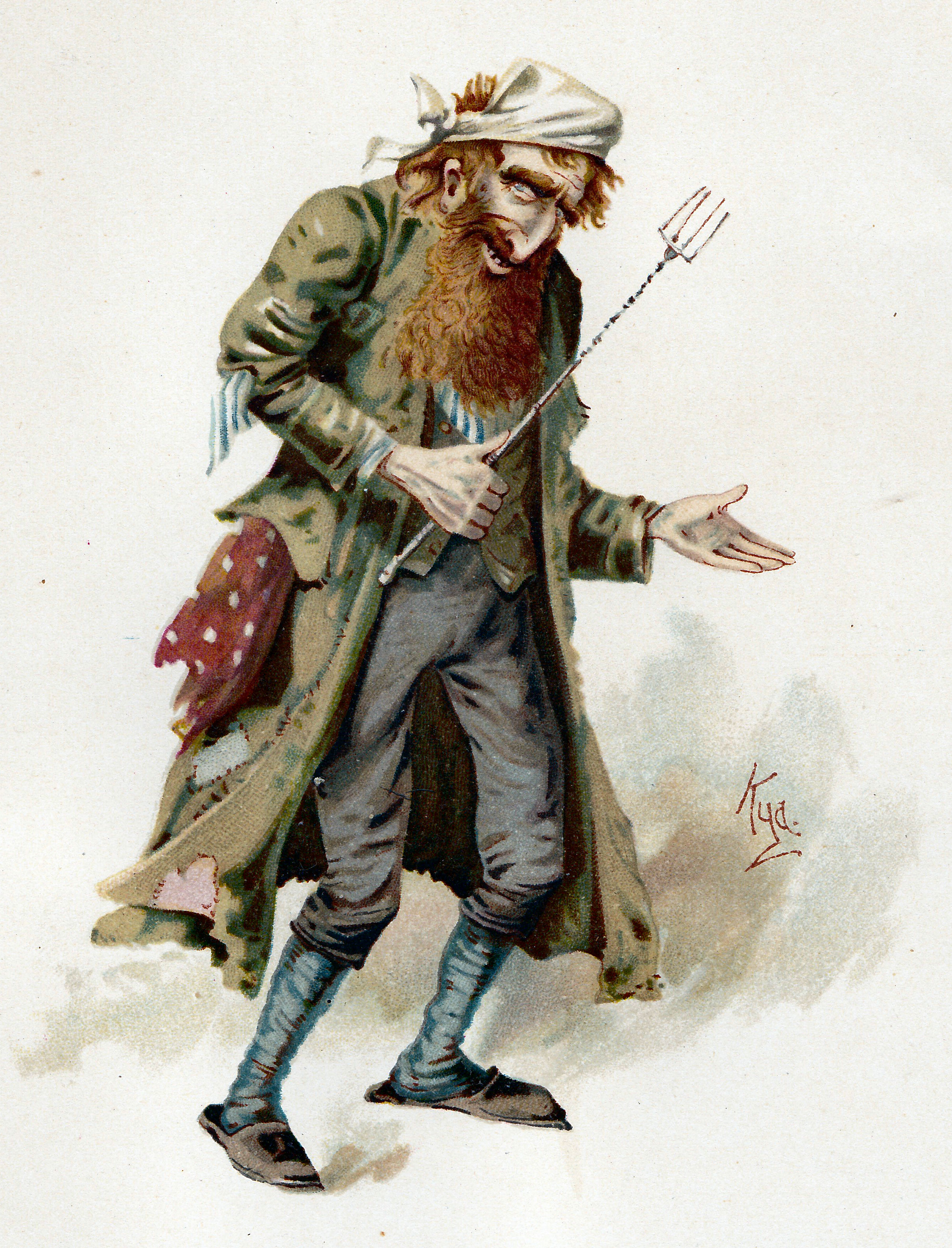
Watercolor illustration by Joseph Clayton Clarke of Fagin, a stereotypical red-haired Jewish criminal from Charles Dickens's novel Oliver Twist

In European culture, prior to the 20th century, red hair was commonly identified as a distinguishing negative Jewish trait. This arose primarily from Christian prejudices inherent within European folklore, where red hair symbolised the fires of hell, as well as being commonly associated with archetypal caricatures of demons. Red hair was especially closely linked with Judas Iscariot, who was commonly depicted with red hair. During the Spanish Inquisition, all those with red hair were identified as Jewish. In Italy, red hair was associated with Italian Jews. In Medieval European lore, "Red Jews" were a semi-fictional group of red-haired Jews, although this tale has obscure origins.

In part due to their Middle Eastern ethnic origins, Jews tend to be portrayed as swarthy and hairy, sometimes associated with a curly hair texture known as a "Jewfro".

==== Hands ====
During the Nazi-era propaganda campaign against Jews, there were repeated mentions of Jews being able to be identified by their use of hands while speaking, "the Jew moves his hands when he talks". This has evolved into modern stereotypes of Jews, much like others in Europe, namely Italians speaking with their hands.

=== Behavioral ===
==== Communication ====
A well-known stereotype about Jewish communication is the tendency to answer a question with a question. In large part, this stereotype arises from the emphasis on questioning in Jewish education; chavrusa partnerships are designed around questioning Talmudic texts, which are structured around questioning different Talmudic texts, which are structured around questioning the Torah. This tradition, among others structured to encourage the value of l'dor v'dor (teaching "from generation to generation") such as the four questions of Passover, have helped create a culture of structured debate.

Jews, specifically Ashkenazi Jews, are also stereotyped as being melodramatic and over-zealously (and sometimes comedically) complaining. The Yiddish word for this behavior is to kvetch. Michael Wex, in his book Born to Kvetch, notes that this can be a real cultural phenomenon of Yiddishkeit; "While answering one complaint with another is usually considered a little excessive in English, Yiddish tends to take a homeopathic approach to kvetching: like cures like and kvetch cures kvetch. The best response to a complaint is another complaint, an antiseptic counter-kvetch that makes further whining impossible for anybody but you."

==== Greed and usury ====
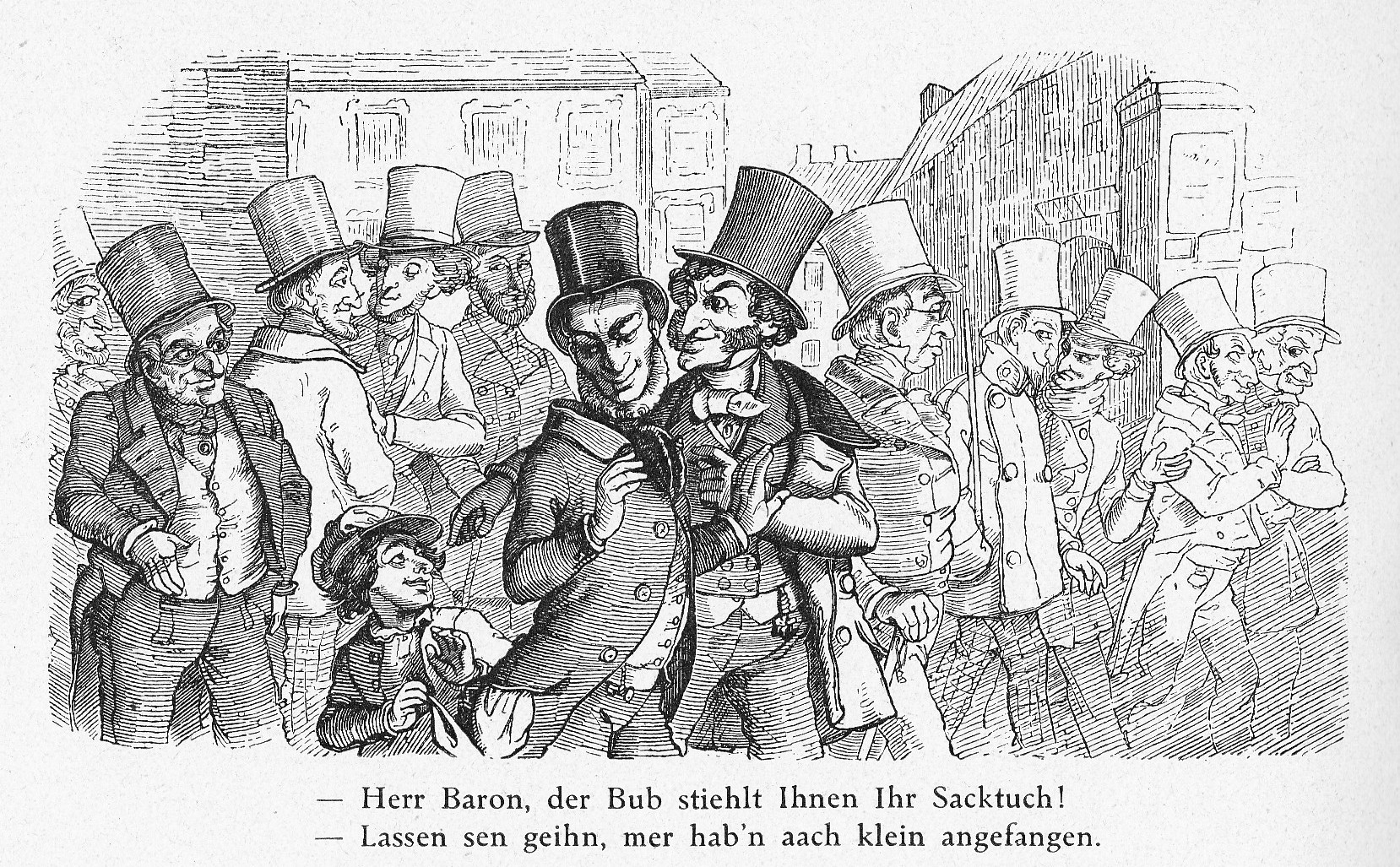
"Herr Baron, that boy just stole your handkerchief!" "So let 'im go; we hadda start out small, too." A German cartoon of 1851 implies ingrained dishonesty in Jews.

Jews have often been stereotyped as greedy and miserly. This originates in the Middle Ages when the Church forbade Christians to lend money while charging interest (a practice called usury, although the word later took on the meaning of charging excessive interest). Jews were legally restricted to occupations usually barred to Christians and thus many went into money-lending. This led to, through the Middle Ages and the Renaissance, the association of Jews with greedy practices.

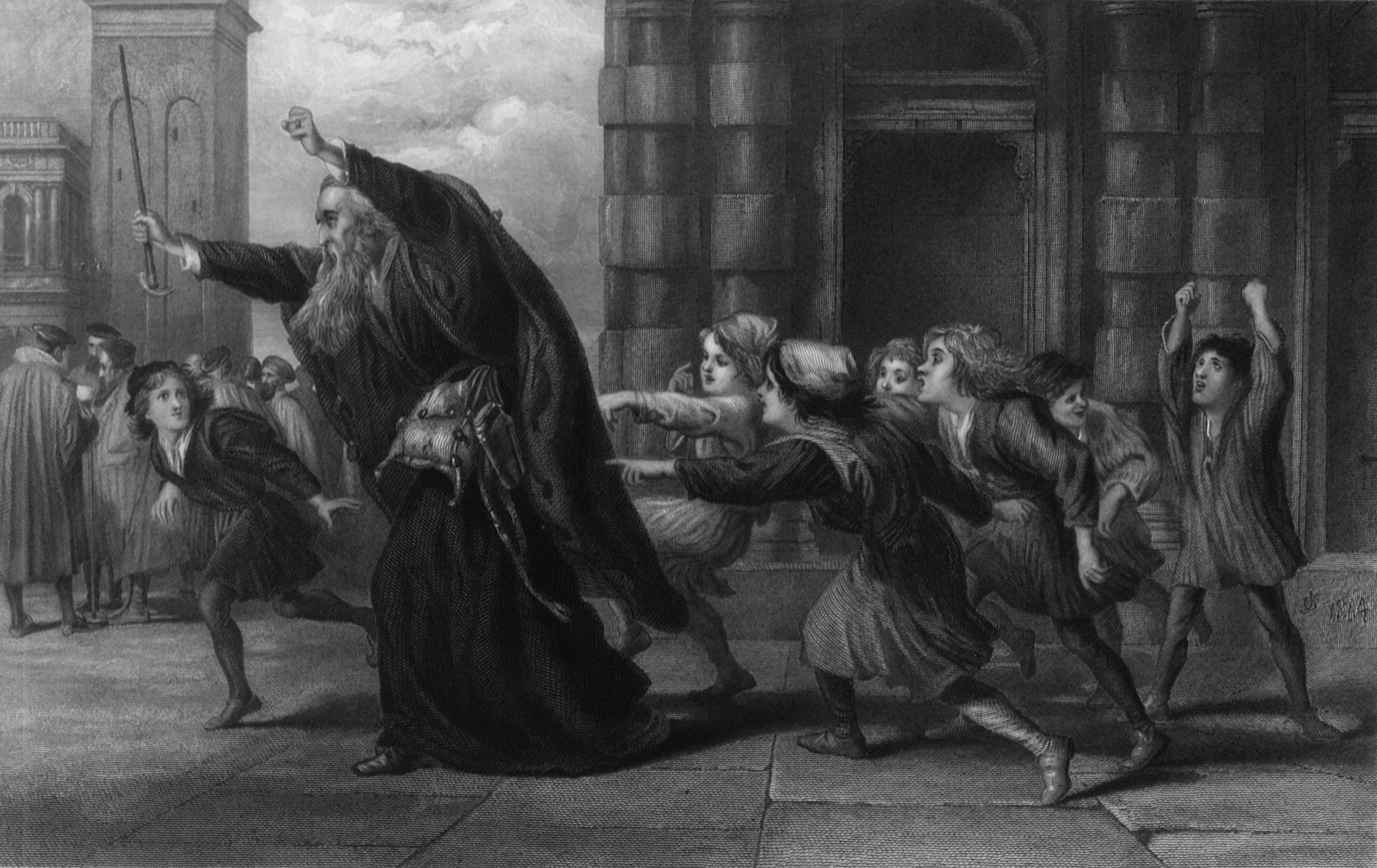
Gilbert's Shylock After the Trial, an illustration to The Merchant of Venice, Stereotypes of Jews

Publications like The Protocols of the Elders of Zion and literature such as William Shakespeare's The Merchant of Venice and Charles Dickens's Oliver Twist reinforced the stereotype of the crooked Jew. Dickens later expressed regret for his portrayal of Fagin in the novel, and toned down references to his Jewishness. Furthermore, the character of Mr. Riah in his later novel Our Mutual Friend is a kindly Jewish creditor, and may have been created as an apology for Fagin. Lesser references in Arabian Nights, The Three Musketeers, and even Hans Brinker are examples of the prevalence of this negative perception. Some, such as Paul Volcker, suggest that the stereotype has decreased in prevalence in the United States. A telephone poll of 1,747 American adults conducted by the Anti-Defamation League in 2009 found that 18% believed that "Jews have too much power in the business world", 13% that "Jews are more willing than others to use shady practices to get what they want", and 12% that "Jews are not just as honest as other businesspeople".

Jewish frugality, thriftiness, and greed are among the typical themes in jokes about Jews, even by Jews themselves.

==== Intelligence ====
A stereotype exists suggesting that Jews (often particularly Ashkenazi Jews, though historically sometimes Sephardi Jews) are more intelligent than other people. This idea, also called "Jewish Genius", emerged during the 19th century within the context of scientific racism. Some 20th and 21st century publications, notably the highly controversial book The Bell Curve, have suggested it is supported by the results of IQ research, though the idea has been thoroughly criticised by Sander L. Gilman, who has described it as a "racial myth".

=== Stereotypical characters ===
==== Belle juive ====
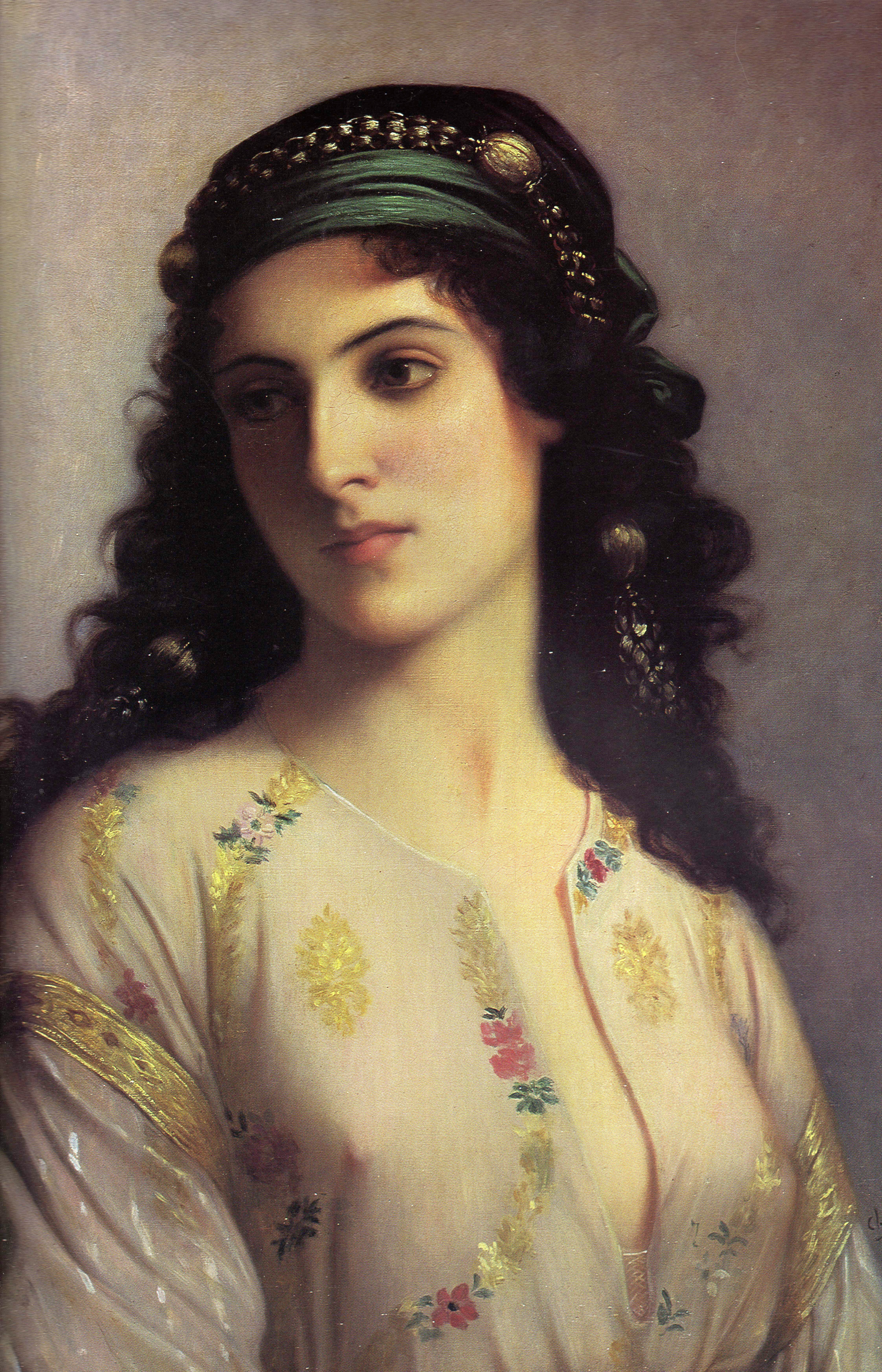
The Jewess of Tangier (after 1866) by Charles Landelle, showing a stereotypical belle juive

La belle juive (French, "the beautiful Jewess") was a 19th-century literary stereotype. A figure meeting the description is often associated with having and causing sexual lust, temptation and sin. Her personality traits could be portrayed either positively or negatively. The typical appearance of the belle juive included long, thick, dark hair, large dark eyes, an olive skin tone, and a languid expression. An example of this stereotype is Rebecca in Sir Walter Scott's Ivanhoe. Another example is Miriam in Nathaniel Hawthorne's romance The Marble Faun.

==== Jewish mother ====
The Jewish mother stereotype is both a common stereotype and a stock character that is used by Jewish as well as non-Jewish comedians, television and film writers, actors, and authors in the United States and elsewhere. The stereotype generally involves a nagging, loud, manipulative, highly-talkative, overprotective, smothering, and overbearing mother, who persists in interfering in her children's lives long after they have become adults and is excellent at making her children feel guilty for actions that may have caused her to suffer. The stereotype is described in detail in Dan Greenburg's best-selling 1964 humor book, How to Be a Jewish Mother: A Very Lovely Training Manual.

The Jewish mother stereotype can also involve a loving and overly proud mother who is highly defensive about her children in front of others. Like Italian mother stereotypes, Jewish mother characters are often shown cooking for the family, urging loved ones to eat more, and taking great pride in their food. Feeding a loved one is characterized as an extension of the desire to mother those around her. Lisa Aronson Fontes describes the stereotype as one of "endless caretaking and boundless self-sacrifice" by a mother who demonstrates her love by "constant overfeeding and unremitting solicitude about every aspect of her children's and husband's welfare[s]".

A possible origin of this stereotype is anthropologist Margaret Mead's research into the European shtetl, financed by the American Jewish Committee. Although her interviews at Columbia University, with 128 European-born Jews, disclosed a wide variety of family structures and experiences, the publications resulting from this study and the many citations in the popular media resulted in the Jewish mother stereotype: a woman intensely loving but controlling to the point of smothering and attempting to engender enormous guilt in her children via the endless suffering which she professes to have experienced on their behalf. The Jewish mother stereotype, then, has origins in the American Jewish community, with predecessors that originated in Eastern European ghettos. In Israel, with its diversity of diasporic backgrounds and where most mothers are Jewish, the same stereotypical mother is known as the Polish mother (ima polania).

Comedian Jackie Mason describes stereotypical Jewish mothers as parents who have become experts in the art of needling their children that they have honorary degrees in "Jewish Acupuncture". Rappoport observes that jokes about the stereotype have less basis in antisemitism than they have in gender stereotyping. William Helmreich agrees, observing that the attributes of a Jewish mother—overprotection, pushiness, aggression, and guilt-inducement—could equally well be ascribed to mothers of other ethnicities, from Italians through Black people to Puerto Rican people. In the book How to Be a Jewish Mother, the author says in the preface that it is not necessary to be either Jewish or a mother to be a Jewish mother.'

The association of this otherwise gender stereotype with Jewish mothers in particular, is, according to Helmreich, because of the importance that Judaism traditionally places on the home and the family, and the mother's important role within that family. Judaism, as exemplified by the Bible (e.g. the Woman of Valor) and elsewhere, ennobles motherhood, and it associates mothers with virtue. This ennoblement was further increased by the poverty and hardship of Eastern European Jews who immigrated into the United States (during the period from 1881 to 1924, when one of the largest waves of such immigration occurred), where the requirements of hard work by the parents were passed on to their children via guilt: "We work so hard so that you can be happy." Other aspects of the stereotype are rooted in those immigrant Jewish parents' drive for their children to succeed, resulting in a push for perfection and a continual dissatisfaction with anything less: "So you got a B? That could have been an A there." Hartman observes that the root of the stereotype is in the self-sacrifice of first-generation immigrants, unable to take full advantage of American education themselves, and the consequent transference of their aspirations, to success and social status, from themselves to their children. A Jewish mother obtains vicarious social status from the achievements of her children, where she is unable to achieve such status herself.

One of the earliest Jewish mother figures in American popular culture was Molly Goldberg, portrayed by Gertrude Berg, in the situation comedy The Goldbergs on radio from 1929 to 1949 and on television from 1949 to 1955. But the stereotype as it came to be understood in the 20th century was exemplified by other literary figures. These include Rose Morgenstern from Herman Wouk's 1955 novel Marjorie Morningstar, Mrs Patimkin from Goodbye, Columbus by Philip Roth, and Sophie Ginsky Portnoy from Portnoy's Complaint also by Roth. Sylvia Barack Fishman's characterization of Marjorie Morningstar and Sophie Portnoy is that they are each "a forceful Jewish woman who tries to control her life and the events around her", who is "intelligent, articulate, and aggressive", who does not passively accept life but tries to shape events, friends, and families, to match their visions of an ideal world.

The Jewish mother became one of two stock female Jewish characters in literature in the 20th century, the other being the Jewish-American princess. The focus of the stereotype was different than its precursors, too. Jewish writers had previously employed a stereotype of an overbearing matron, but its focus had always been not on the woman, but the ineffectual man whom she dominated, out of necessity. The focus of the Jewish mother stereotype that arose was based on a shift in the economic circumstances of American Jews during the 20th century. American Jews were no longer struggling first-generation immigrants, living in impoverished neighborhoods. The "soldier woman" work ethos of Jewish women, and the levels of anxiety and dramatization of their lives, were seen as unduly excessive for lifestyles that had (for middle-class Jews) become far more secure and suburban by the middle of the century. Jewish literature came to focus upon the differences between Jewish women and what Jews saw as being the various idealized views of American women, the "blonde bombshell", the "sex kitten", or the sweet docile "apple-pie" blonde who always supported her man. In contrast, Jewish writers viewed the still articulate and intelligent Jewish woman as being, by comparison, pushy, unrefined, and unattractive.

Fishman describes the Jewish mother stereotype that was used by male Jewish writers as "a grotesque mirror image of the proverbial Woman of Valor". A Jewish mother was a woman who had her own ideas about life, who attempted to conquer her sons and her husband, and used food, hygiene, and guilt as her weapons. Like Helmreich, Fishman observes that while it began as a universal gender stereotype, exemplified by Erik Erikson's critique of "Momism" in 1950 and Philip Wylie's blast, in his 1942 Generation of Vipers, against "dear old Mom" tying all of male America to her apron strings, it quickly became highly associated with Jewish mothers in particular, in part because the idea became a staple of Jewish American fiction.

This stereotype enjoyed a mixed reception in the mid-20th century. In her 1967 essay "In Defense of the Jewish Mother", Zena Smith Blau defended the stereotype, asserting that the ends, inculcating virtues that resulted in success, justified the means, control through love and guilt. Being tied to mamma kept Jewish boys away from "[g]entile friends, particularly those from poor, immigrant families with rural origins in which parents did not value education". One example of the stereotype, as it had developed by the 1970s, was the character of Ida Morgenstern, the mother of Rhoda Morgenstern, who first appeared in a recurring role on The Mary Tyler Moore Show, and later appeared as a regular on its spinoff Rhoda.

According to Alisa Lebow, in the late 20th and early 21st centuries, the stereotype of the Jewish mother has "gone missing" from movies. She observes that there appears to have been no conscious effort on the part of screenwriters or film-makers to rewrite or change the stereotype, in pursuance of some revisionist agenda, instead, it has simply fallen back a generation. Despite this, the concept of the Jewish mother can still be seen in popular culture even though it is declining in film. One use of the Jewish mother stereotype-trope can be seen in the popular television program The Big Bang Theory, which premiered in 2007, and it was played by the character of Howard Wolowitz's mother who is only heard as a voice character. Mrs. Wolowitz is loud, overbearing, and overprotective of her son. In the television show South Park, Sheila Broflovski, the mother of its main character Kyle Broflovski, is Jewish and represents a caricature of the stereotypes that are associated with her ethnicity and role, such as speaking loudly, having a New Jersey accent and being overprotective of her son. This character can also be seen from George Costanza’s mother in Seinfeld, and Daniela Paguro, mother of the main character of the movie Luca.

==== Jewish-American princess ====
Jewish-American princess (JAP) is a pejorative stereotype that portrays some upper-middle-class Jewish women as spoiled brats, implying entitlement and selfishness, attributed to a pampered or wealthy background. This stereotype of American Jewish women has frequently been portrayed in contemporary US media since the mid-20th century. "JAPs" are portrayed as being used to privilege, materialistic, and neurotic. An example of the humorous use of this stereotype appears in the song "Jewish Princess" on the Frank Zappa album Sheik Yerbouti. Female Jewish comedians such as Sarah Silverman have also satirized the stereotype, as did filmmaker Robert Townsend in his comedy B*A*P*S (see also Black American Princess for more information on this related pejorative stereotype).

According to Rebecca Alpert, the stereotype of the Jewish-American Princess did not emerge until after World War II and it is "peculiar to the U.S. scene". In 1987, the American Jewish Committee held a conference on "Current Stereotypes of Jewish Women" which argued that such jokes "represent a resurgence of sexist and anti-Semitic invective masking a scrim of misogyny."

The stereotype was partly a construct of, and popularized by, some post-war Jewish male writers, notably Herman Wouk in his 1955 novel Marjorie Morningstar and Philip Roth in his 1959 novel Goodbye, Columbus, featuring protagonists who fit the stereotype.

The term "JAP" and its associated stereotype first gained attention at the beginning of the 1970s with the publication of several non-fiction articles such as Barbara Meyer's Cosmopolitan article "Sex and the Jewish Girl" and the 1971 cover article in New York magazine by Julie Baumgold, "The Persistence of the Jewish Princess". "JAP" jokes became prevalent in the late 1970s and early 1980s. According to Riv-Ellen Prell, the JAP stereotype's rise to prominence in the 1970s resulted from pressures that were placed on the Jewish middle class and forced it to maintain a visibly affluent lifestyle even as post-war affluence declined. The concept was the butt of jokes and as a result, it was spoofed by many, including Jews. Mel Brooks' Spaceballs had a character named Princess Vespa (Daphne Zuniga), who proclaimed, "I am Vespa, daughter of Roland, King of the Druids!" Captain Lonestar (Bill Pullman) complained, "That's all we needed, a Druish princess!" Barf (John Candy) added, "Funny, she doesn't look Druish!"

The stereotypical subject, as described in these sources, is overindulged with attention and money by her parents, resulting in the princess having unrealistic expectations as well as guilt, accompanied by her skill in the manipulation of guilt in others, resulting in deficient love life. The stereotype has been described as "a sexually repressive, self-centered, materialistic and lazy female," who is "spoiled, overly-concerned with appearance, and indifferent to sex", the last being her most notable trait. The stereotype also portrays relationships with weak men who are easily controlled and willing to spend large amounts of money and energy in order to recreate the dynamic which she had during her upbringing. These men tend to be completely content with catering to her endless needs for food, material possessions, and attention.

The stereotype is often, though not always, the basis for jokes both inside and outside the Jewish community. Frank Zappa was accused of antisemitism for his 1979 song "Jewish Princess", which describes the narrator's lust for "a nasty little Jewish princess / With long phony nails and a hairdo that rinses". Zappa repeatedly denied antisemitic intention and refused to apologize on the basis that he did not invent the concept and further noted that women who fit the stereotype actually existed. In recent years, some Jewish women have made attempts to re-appropriate the term "JAP" and incorporate it as part of cultural identity. It has also been criticized as having a sexist basis, and for pejoratively branding young adult Jewish-American women as being spoiled and materialistic. Concerns about incidents of the JAP stereotype being pejoratively used at colleges and universities have been noted in newspapers, magazines and academic journals. The American television show Crazy Ex-Girlfriend, created by Rachel Bloom, features a parody song that can be seen as both satirizing and embracing this trope. "JAP Battle" is featured in Season 1's "Josh and I Go to Los Angeles!". Rachel Bloom, and her character Rebecca Bunch, are both Jewish.

==== Jewish lawyer ====
The concept of the "Jewish lawyer" is a stereotype of Jews, which portrays Jews and Jewish lawyers as being clever, greedy, exploitative, dishonest, and depicts them as engaging in moral turpitude and excessive legalism. Ted Merwin writes that in the United States the stereotype became popular in the mid-to-late 20th century when Jews started entering the legal profession. Jews entered the U.S. legal profession decades before the middle of the 20th century – by the time of the Great Depression, many Jews had already established themselves as lawyers.

The stock character of the Jewish lawyer frequently appears in popular culture. Jay Michaelson writes in The Jewish Daily Forward that the character of Maurice Levy, in the drama series The Wire, is stereotypical, with a "New York accent and the quintessential pale skin, brown hair and Ashkenazic nose of the typical American Jew".

This stereotyping is parodied in Breaking Bad and its spinoff series Better Call Saul, where the character Saul Goodman (born James McGill) is an Irish-American lawyer who pretends to be a Jewish-American for his clients, believing that it makes him appear more competent as a lawyer. In Curb Your Enthusiasm, Larry David (playing a fictionalised version of himself) fires his divorce lawyer Berg, who likewise pretends to be Jewish, and hires a Jewish lawyer instead.

==== Nice Jewish boy ====
The nice Jewish boy (NJB) is a stereotype of Jewish masculinity that circulates within the American Jewish community, as well as in mainstream American culture. Jewish men have been historically viewed as effeminate, especially in contrast to the more violent masculinity of the Roman society where Rabbinic Judaism emerged from. Jewish masculinity puts more emphasis on studying and academic pursuits than on physical strength. However, male Jews have also been labeled as feminine in an antisemitic context. It was once even a widely-held view that Jewish men menstruated. The trope stemmed from the belief that circumcision was equivalent to castration. Jewish men have often been assigned feminine physical and mental traits in order to designate them as deficient in comparison to the dominant idea of masculinity. For example, in the late 1800s, Jewish men were depicted with narrow chests, chubbiness, and hysteria, all of which were traditionally female characteristics. The idea that Jewish men were effeminate even made its way into Nazi racial theories that adopted Austrian philosopher Otto Weininger's claim that "the Jew is more saturated in femininity than the Aryan."

The qualities which are ascribed to the nice Jewish boy are derived from the Ashkenazic ideal of אײדלקײַט (eydlkayt, either "nobility" or "delicateness" in Yiddish). According to Daniel Boyarin's Unheroic Conduct (University of California Press, 1997), eydlkayt embraces the studiousness, gentleness and sensitivity that is said to distinguish the Talmudic scholar and make him an attractive marriage partner.

The resistance that a Jewish male may launch against this image in his quest to become a "regular guy" has found its place in Jewish American literature. Norman Podhoretz, the former editor of Commentary, made the following comment about Norman Mailer's literary and "extracurricular" activities:

He spent his entire life trying to extirpate what he himself called the 'nice Jewish boy' from his soul, which is one of the reasons he has done so many outrageous things and gotten into trouble, including with the police. It's part of trying to overcome that lifelong terror of being a sissy.

For Philip Roth's semi-autobiographical avatar Alex Portnoy, neither the nice Jewish boy nor his more aggressively masculine counterparts (the churlish Jewboy, the "all-American" ice hockey player) prove to be acceptable identities to attain. The ceaseless floundering between the two fuels Portnoy's Complaint.

== History ==
Martin Marger writes "A set of distinct and consistent negative stereotypes, some of which can be traced as far back as the Middle Ages in Europe, has been applied to Jews." Antisemitic canards such as the blood libel first appeared in the 12th century and were associated with attacks and massacres against Jews. These stereotypes are paralleled in the earlier (7th century) writings of the Quran which state that wretchedness and baseness were stamped upon the Jews, and they were visited with wrath from Allah because they disbelieved in Allah's revelations and slew the prophets wrongfully. And for their taking usury, which was prohibited for them, and because of their consuming people's wealth under false pretense, a painful punishment was prepared for them.

=== Medieval Europe ===
The portrayal of Jews as historic enemies of Christianity and Christendom constitutes the most damaging anti-Jewish stereotype which is reflected in the works of literature that were produced from the late tenth century through the early twelfth century. Jews were often depicted as satanic consorts, or as devils themselves and "incarnation[s] of absolute evil." Physically, Jews were portrayed as menacing, hirsute, with boils, warts and other deformities, and sometimes they were portrayed with horns, cloven hoofs and tails. Such imagery was used centuries later in the Nazi propaganda of the 1930s and 1940s. This propaganda leaned on Jewish stereotypes to explain the claim that the Jewish people belong to an "inferior" race. Adolf Hitler portrayed Jews with stereotypes such as being greedy bankers, overly focused on legal details, lecherous, lustful men, and seductive yet harmful women. He also stereotyped Jews as both sexual predators and effeminate.

Although Jews had not been particularly associated with moneylending in antiquity, a stereotype of them acting in this capacity was first developed in the 11th century. Jonathan Frankel notes that even though this stereotype was an obvious exaggeration, it had a solid basis in reality. While not all Jews were moneylenders, the Catholic Church's prohibition of usury meant that Jews were the main representatives of the trade.

Hitler hated Jews and sought to kill them because he believed they were after world dominance. He blamed them for everything that was wrong with the world. Hitler believed Germany was weak and was in decline due to the country's ‘Jewish influence’.

During the medieval period in Europe, Jews were portrayed as avaricious moneylenders, malevolent Satanic enemies of Christianity and the white race, or as bearers of diseases and ruin. Jews are often perceived as affluent, secretive, insular, dishonest, lascivious, sexually immoral, disloyal, cunning, greedy and shrewd.

=== United States ===
David Schneider writes "Three large clusters of traits are part of the Jewish stereotype (Wuthnow, 1982). First, Jews are seen as being powerful and manipulative. Second, they are accused of dividing their loyalties between the United States and Israel. The third set of traits concerns Jewish materialistic values, aggressiveness, clannishness."

About one-third of Europe's Jewish population emigrated in the nineteenth and early decades of the twentieth century. About 80 percent of those emigrants chose America. Although there is no doubt that Europe's depiction of the Jews influenced the United States, there were no immense massacres, pogroms, or legal restrictions on the Jews. Based on the fact that America is made up of immigrants, American Jewry identity is described as "fluid, negotiable, and highly voluntary." Within the first Jewish communities, the colonies gave the Jews the chance to live openly as Jews. The attitude towards Jews in the eyes of the colonial authorities was that they carried several assets for business. Most Jews settled in port cities and thrived in trade by relying on family and community ties for negotiating. Peddling, specifically, improved the image of Jews in the eyes of the early Americans that allowed them into their homes, fed them food, and sometimes let them stay the night in their home. Peddling gave the chance to shed outward appearance stereotypes. Commentators noted they often wore a waistcoat and tie, with a top hat on their heads. For they understood a customer would be less likely to open their door to a shabby, dirty man, than a man in an elegant dress.

From 1914 to 1918, World War I shaped the identity and attitudes of American Jews for the better, yet is overshadowed by the devastation and catastrophe of World War II. For the first time, American Jews were seen as major philanthropists, which is now a central part of American Judaism. The stereotype of being greedy and miserly seemed to be challenged. Aid was provided to Jews overseas by a new organization, the American Jewish Joint Distribution Committee. By the end of the war, the Joint raised more than $16.5 million, which is equivalent to about $260 million today.

However, attitudes towards the Jews changed after World War I; 1920–1940 saw American antisemitism at its peak. Many left-wing Jews showed sympathy toward, or even supported, the Russian Revolution. Jews were impressed by the Soviet's commitment to giving Jews equal civil, political, and national rights, which fueled the Jewish plots conspiracy theories. Movements of restricting immigration, such as the Immigration Act of 1924, often had individuals express suspicion and hatred of the Jews. In the intellectual context, social scientists were asking questions like, "Will the Jews ever Lose their Racial Identity?" and, "Are the Jews an Inferior Race?" In 1938, according to opinion polls, about 50 percent of Americans had low opinions of Jews. Americans still believed the Jews to be untrustworthy and dishonest. Many hoped that the racial stereotypes would disappear if the Jews worked to mold themselves. A massive amount of effort was put towards Jewish charities, especially for new immigrants, in response to antisemitism in America.

The twenty years following World War II are considered the American Jewry "golden age" because of the triumph of "prosperity and affluence, suburbanization and acceptance, the triumph of political and cultural liberalism, and the expansiveness of unlimited possibilities." Jews participated in American culture including the entertainment and film industries, advertising, and organized sports, baseball in particular. More recently, benign stereotypes of Jews have been found to be more prevalent than images of an overtly antisemitic nature. The Anti-Defamation League (ADL), released nationwide telephone surveys to analyse American beliefs on the Jews. The league concluded that in 2007, 15% of Americans, nearly 35 million adults, hold "unquestionably anti-Semitic" views about Jews. More than one quarter, 27% of Americans believe Jews were responsible for the death of Jesus. On a more positive note, many Americans have positive views towards the Jews on ethics and family. About 65% of Americans believe the Jews had a "special commitment to social justice and civil rights." About 79% of Americans believe the Jews put an "emphasis on the importance of family life."

== In popular culture ==
Jewish stereotypes in literature have evolved over the centuries. According to Louis Harap, nearly all European writers prior to the twentieth century who included Jewish characters in their works projected stereotypical depictions. Harap cites Gotthold Lessing's Nathan the Wise (1779) as the first time that Jews were portrayed in the arts as "human beings, with human possibilities and characteristics." Harap writes that the persistence of the Jewish stereotype over the centuries suggests to some that "the treatment of the Jew in literature was completely static and was essentially unaffected by the changes in the Jewish situation in society as that society itself changed." He contrasts the opposing views presented in the two most comprehensive studies of Jewish characters in English literature, one by Montagu Frank Modder and the other by Edgar Rosenberg. Modder asserts that writers invariably "reflect the attitude of contemporary society in their presentation of the Jewish character and that the portrayal changes with the economic and social changes of each decade." In opposition to Modder's "historical rationale", Rosenberg warns that such a perspective "is apt to slight the massive durability of a stereotype". Harap suggests that the recurrence of the Jewish stereotype in literature is itself one indicator of the continued presence of antisemitism amongst those who consume literature.

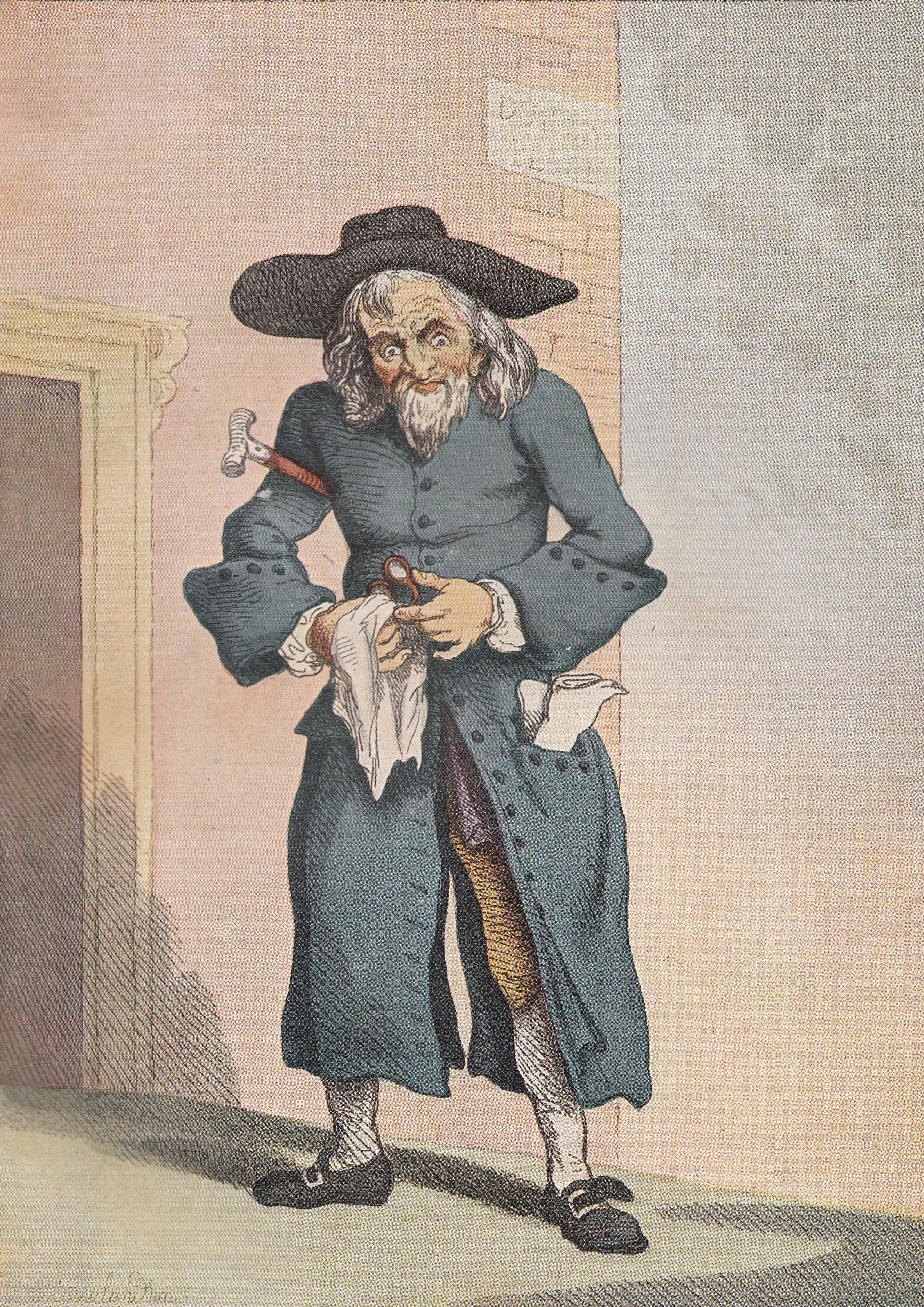
A Jew Broker by Thomas Rowlandson, 1789

Historian Gary Rosenshield writes that while Soviets passed legislation that made antisemitism against Jews "technically a crime, and as political oppression increased, both Jewish and non-Jewish authors avoided the portrayal of Jews in their works", stereotypical depiction of Jews "flourished" among the works of prominent British, Irish and American authors such as Dorothy Richardson, Virginia Woolf, T.S. Eliot, Evelyn Waugh, James Joyce, Ezra Pound and Graham Greene (with characters such as Shylock, Fagin and Svengali). Rosenshield writes that among the many authors who employed stereotypical depictions of Jews in their works, T.S. Eliot and Ezra Pound have received the most attention in modern historiography. Eliot has been accused of being antisemitic by John Gross and Anthony Julius, while Ezra Pound was a self-proclaimed antisemite, making several broadcasts for the Italian government blaming the Second World War on usury and Jews.

Stereotypical depictions of Jews in American literature started to emerge around the 1890s. Although Jewish stereotypes first appeared in works by non-Jewish writers, after the Second World War it was often Jewish-American writers themselves who evoked such stereotypical imagery. The prevalence of antisemitic stereotypes in the works of such authors has sometimes been interpreted as an expression of self-hatred; however, Jewish American authors have also used these negative stereotypes in order to refute them.

=== Jewface ===
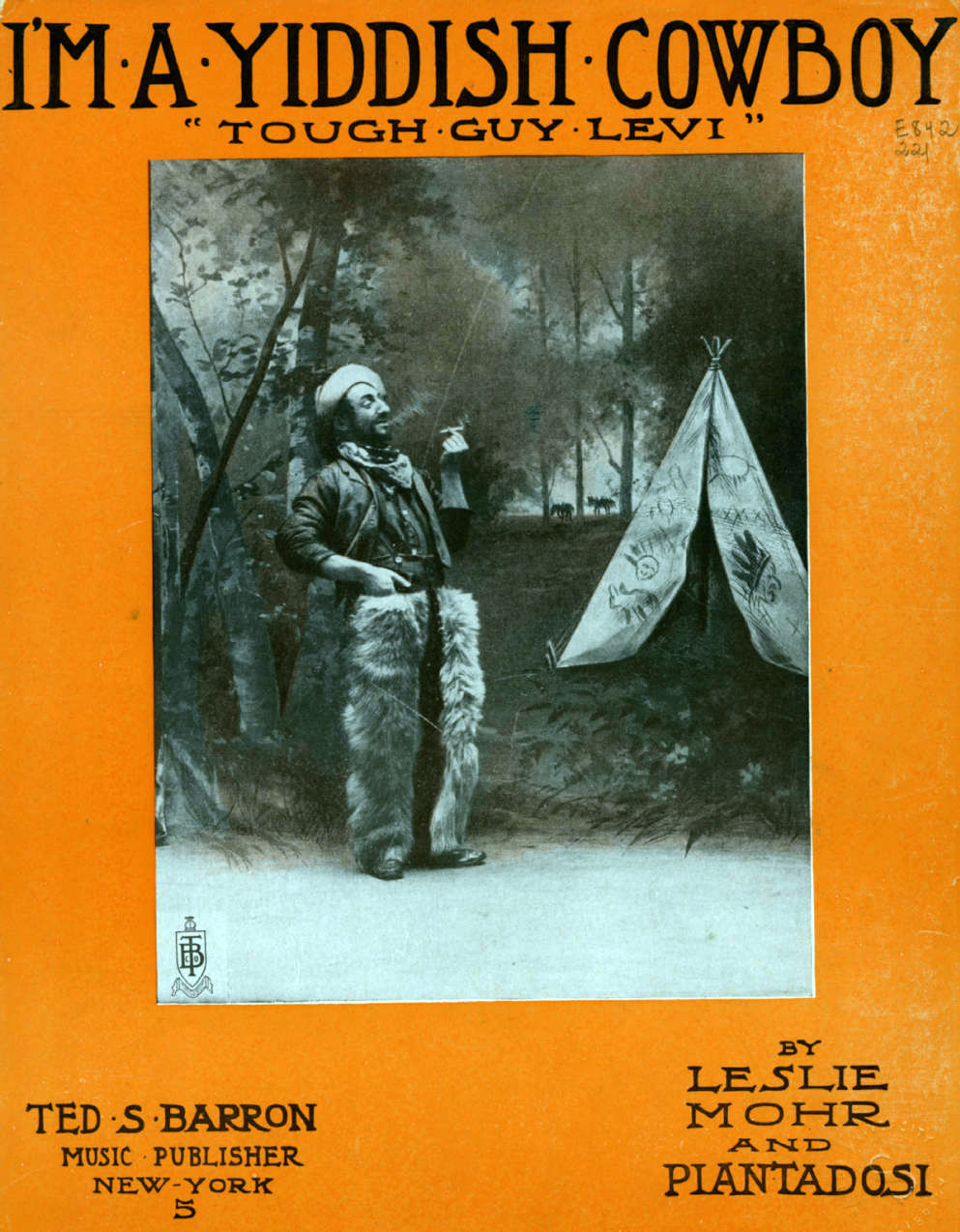
I'm a Yiddish Cowboy (1908)

"Jewface" was a vaudeville act that became popular among Ashkenazi Jews who immigrated to the United States in the 1880s. The name plays off the term "blackface", and the act featured performers enacting Jewish stereotypes, wearing large putty noses, long beards, and tattered clothing, and speaking with thick Yiddish accent. Early portrayals were done by non-Jews, but Jews soon began to produce their own "Jewface" acts. By the early 20th century, almost all the "Jewface" actors, managers, agents, and audience members were Jewish. "Jewface" featured Jewish dialect music, written by Tin Pan Alley songwriters. These vaudeville acts were controversial at the time. In 1909 a prominent Reform rabbi said that comedy like this was "the cause of greater prejudice against the Jews as a class than all other causes combined," and that same year the Central Conference of American Rabbis denounced this type of comedy.

On May 16, 2014, Rapper Macklemore gave a performance at Experience Music Project where he dressed as an antisemitic caricature.

The exhibit Jewface: "Yiddish" Dialect Songs of Tin Pan Alley at the YIVO Institute for Jewish Research (November 2015 to June 2016, curated by Eddy Portnoy) was focused on the sheet music of this type of comedy and used Jody Rosen's sheet music collection.

== Jews in politics ==
Research on voting in the United States has shown that stereotypes play a crucial role in voter decision making on both a conscious and subconscious level. Jewish political candidates are stereotyped as liberal. Since becoming heavily involved in politics and the electoral process in the 1930s, Jewish leaders and voters have taken liberal stances on a number of issues. From there the stereotype grew and is now assumed even though not always accurate. An example of this took place in the 2000 presidential election where Joseph Lieberman was Al Gore's vice presidential running mate. He was labeled by some as a liberal even though he described himself as "pro-business, pro-trade and pro-economic growth." Although he had taken ostensibly moderate and conservative positions on numerous issues, the stereotype defined him to many voters.

== See also ==
- Antisemitic trope
- Antisemitism
- Allosemitism
- Anti-Zionism
- Economic antisemitism
- Expulsions and exoduses of Jews
- Geography of antisemitism
- Happy Merchant
- History of antisemitism
- Jewish cuisine
- Jewish culture
- Jewish diaspora
- Jewish ethnic divisions
- Jewish history
- Jewish humor
- Model minority
- Perpetual foreigner
- New antisemitism
- Orientalism
- Persecution of Jews
- Racial antisemitism
- Religious antisemitism
- Self-hating Jew
- Triple parentheses
- Discrimination in the United States
  - Anti-Catholicism in the United States
  - Anti-Chinese sentiment in the United States
  - Anti-Japanese sentiment in the United States
  - Antisemitism in the United States
  - History of antisemitism in the United States
  - Islamophobia in the United States
  - Racism against African Americans
  - Racism in the United States
  - Religious discrimination in the United States
- Stereotypes of groups within the United States
  - Stereotypes of African Americans
  - Stereotypes of Americans
  - Stereotypes of Arabs and Muslims in the United States
  - Stereotypes of East Asian Americans in the United States
  - Stereotypes of Hispanic and Latino Americans in the United States
  - Stereotypes of South Asians
  - Stereotypes of White Americans
  - Blonde stereotype
  - LGBT stereotypes

== Bibliography ==
- William Helmreich, The Things they Say Behind your Back: Stereotypes and the Myths Behind Them (Doubleday)
