= Stereotypes of Americans =

Generalized representations of US people

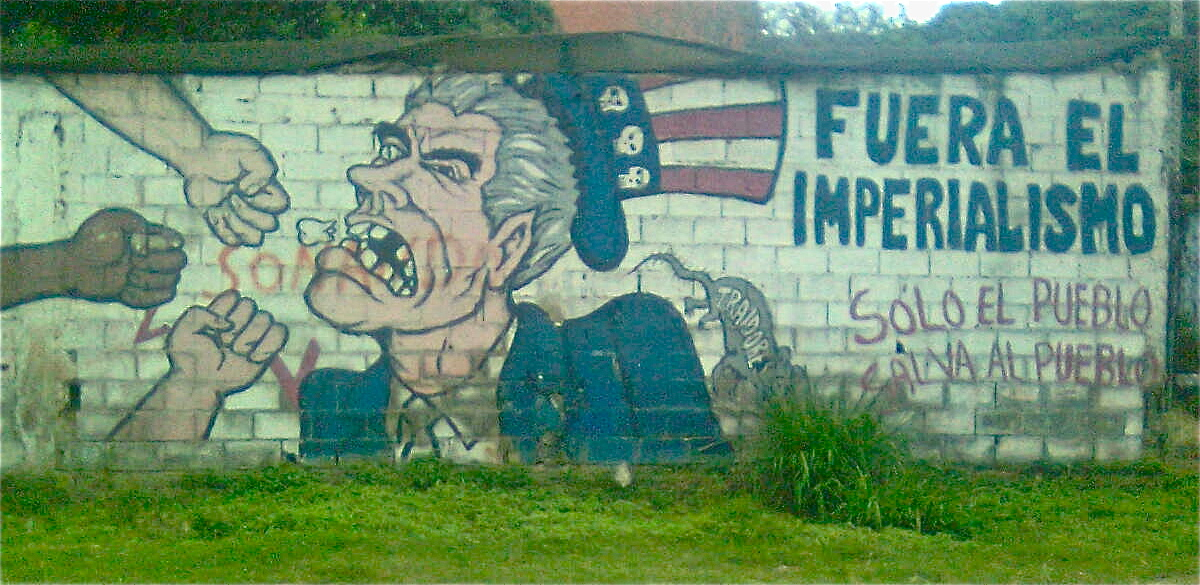
Anti-American street art, depicting Uncle Sam, with anti-imperialist slogan ('out with imperialism') In Caracas, Venezuela.

Stereotypes of American people are the popularly held generalizations of Americans and American culture.

These stereotypes can be found across cultures in television, literature, art and public opinion. Not all of the stereotypes are equally popular, nor are they all restricted to Americans; and although most can be considered negative, a few assign neutral, positive or admiring qualities to the stereotypical American citizen. Many of the ethnic stereotypes collide with otherwise unrelated political anti-Americanism.

== Stereotypes with positive use ==
Trait	Description
Generosity	Alexis de Tocqueville first noted in 1835 the American attitude towards helping others in need. A 2010 Charities Aid Foundation study found that Americans were the fifth most willing to donate time and money in the world at 55%. Total charitable contributions in 2010 were higher in the US than in any other country.
Optimism	Americans may be seen as very positive and optimistic people.
Hardworking nature	Americans may be stereotyped as hardworking people, whether in their jobs or other matters.
Frontier mentality	Traits such as engaging in risky exploration to secure food and territory favored early Americans, as well as the willingness to move one's life in pursuit of goals such as personal freedom and economic affluence. These traits may have distilled over time into an individualism characterized by toughness and self-reliance.
Straight, white teeth	Americans have been known for having straight white teeth abroad. This is derived from Hollywood, advertising, and cosmetic trends.

== Stereotypes with neutral use ==
Trait	Description	Notes
Vocal fry among women	A vocal fry is the lowest vocal register produced through a loose glottal closure. In the United States, The vocal fry is commonly associated with the valley girl subculture and California English. When asked to read a passage, American female speakers used vocal fry at a rate four times higher than male speakers.	
Individualism	Americans usually prefer individualism over collectivism. This is derived from American frontier life during westward expansion in the 18th and 19th centuries.	
Leaning	A perceived tendency of Americans to stand with their weight on one foot or to lean against nearby objects while waiting in public.	

== Stereotypes with negative use ==
Trait	Description	Notes
Obsession with guns	The United States has a historical fondness for guns, and this is often portrayed in American media. A considerable percentage of Americans own firearms, and the United States has some of the developed world's highest death rates caused by firearms. A 2018 article attributed the high death rates to mass shootings or inner city violence, but the murder rate in America was then on a decline, and it appeared that suicide by firearm is a large contributor to the "gun-deaths" statistic. International media organizations often report on American mass shootings, making these incidents well known internationally. In 2007, the United States was ranked number one in gun ownership with a rate of 88.8 guns per 100 residents. In 2017, the United States again ranked number one in gun ownership with a rate of 120.5 guns per 100 citizens.	
Materialism, over-consumption, and extreme capitalism	A common stereotype of Americans is that of economic materialism and capitalism. They may be seen as caring most about money, judging all things by their economic value, and scorning those of lower socioeconomic status.	
Lack of cultural awareness	Americans may be stereotyped as ignorant of countries and cultures beyond their own. This stereotype shows them as lacking intellectual curiosity, thus making them ignorant of other cultures, places, or lifestyles outside of the United States. The stereotype of a decline in cultural awareness among American students is attributed by some critics to the ostensible declining standards of American schools and curricula. When travelling abroad, Americans can be identified by their posture and tendency to lean on objects.	
Racism and racialism	Racism had a significant presence in American history throughout the 18th, 19th, and early to mid 20th centuries. Following the emancipation of Black slaves after the American Civil War and the civil rights movements of the 1950s and 1960s, Americans of all races achieved the same freedoms and legal protections as the white-majority population, and discrimination against people of minority races due to their race is now illegal. Foreign observers frequently stereotype American society as deeply divided by race and inherently racist. Additionally, a 2017 survey showed that 58% of Americans themselves view structural racism as a major problem.	
Environmental ignorance	Americans may be seen as reckless and imprudent regarding the preservation of the environment. They may be portrayed in international commentary as consumer-driven, driving high-polluting SUVs, and relatively unconcerned about climate change or global warming. The United States (whose population is 327 million) has the second-highest carbon dioxide emissions after China (whose population is 1.4 billion), is one of the few countries which did not ratify the Kyoto Protocol, and one of three countries to refuse to participate in the Paris Agreement. In the context of stereotyping, it is perhaps more relevant to look at CO_{2} production per capita; the USA compares favorably with oil-producing nations in the Middle East, with Qatar at 40.3 metric tons per capita versus the United States' 17.6 metric tons per capita, though they are behind most European countries. Germany, for instance, emits only 9.1 metric tons per capita. The United States has reduced their energy-related greenhouse gas emissions by 12% from 2005 to 2018.	
Arrogance and nationalism	Americans are often stereotyped as arrogant. They are frequently depicted in foreign media as excessively nationalistic and obnoxiously patriotic, believing the United States is better than all other countries and patronizing foreigners. Americans may be seen by people of other countries as arrogant and egomaniacal. In 2009, then-U.S. president Barack Obama said that the United States has "shown arrogance and been dismissive, even derisive" towards its allies.	See also: Americentrism, Ugly American (pejorative), and Global arrogance
Workaholic culture	The United States has been criticized as having a workaholic culture. In The Huffington Post, Tijana Milosevic, a Serbian who had traveled to Washington, D.C. for a degree, wrote, "In fact my family and friends had observed that I shouldn’t have chosen America, since I would probably feel better in Western Europe — where life is not as fast paced as in the US and capitalism still has a 'human face.'" She noted that "Americans still work nine full weeks (350 hours) longer than West Europeans do and paid vacation days across Western Europe are well above the US threshold." Researchers at Oxford Economics hired by the US Travel Association estimated that in 2014 "about 169m [vacation] days, equivalent to $52.4bn in lost benefits", went unused by American workers. Professor Gary L. Cooper argued Americans "have a great deal to learn from Europeans about getting better balance between work and life" and wrote: The notion that working long hours and not taking holidays makes for a more productive workforce is, in my view, a managerial myth, with no foundation in organizational or psychological science. The human body is a biological machine, and like all machines can wear out. In addition, if employees don't invest personal disposal time in their relationships outside, with their family, loved ones and friends, they will be undermining the very social support systems they may need in difficult and stressful times	
Obesity	A very common stereotype of Americans, attested across the globe, is that they are overweight or obese. The "fat American" trope usually goes hand-in-hand with stereotypes of consumerism, but geopolitically, it has also been associated with expansionism and cultural imperialism. In 2017, a study found that overweight Asians were more likely to be seen as "American" than non-overweight Asians, though the same was not true for other ethnicities.	See also: Obesity in the United States
Driving habits	Americans are seen to be over-reliant on personal automobiles, while neglecting other forms of transport such as biking or public transport. They are also seen to be easily confused by roundabouts.	
Jingoism	Americans can be seen as jingoistic. The United States often regards itself as the Global Policeman, in a position to dictate international law to other countries.	
Violent	Americans and American society in general are often viewed as violent. The vast majority of school shootings occur in the US and the school shootings are often regarded as a primarily American phenomenon.	
Anti-Intellectualism	Americans are often stereotyped as uneducated or more broadly anti-intellectual, according to historian Richard Hofstadter in his book 'Anti-intellectualism in American Life', anti-intellectualism stems from Populism, Evangelical Christianity, Business-style Pragmatism, and political scapegoating.	
Monolingualism	A large majority of Americans only speak English, According to recent U.S. Census American Community Survey estimates, about 78 percent of people age 5 and older speak only English at home. 77–78 percent of people in the U.S. age 5 and older speak only English at home per 2023 census.	
Wearing Shoes indoors	Removal of footwear indoors isn't a tradition in the continental United States, and the practice of wearing shoes indoors is heavily criticized for being unsanitary.	
Political polarization and tribalism	American politics is often perceived as polarized and Americans are viewed as having tribalistic attitudes towards their parties or ideologies.	See also: Political polarization in the United States

== See also ==
- American imperialism
- Americanization
- Americentrism
- Anti-Americanism
- American studies
- American Idiot (song)
- Climate change in the United States
- Culture of the United States
- Global warming controversy in the United States
- Media bias in the United States
- Propaganda in the United States
- Stereotypes of groups within the United States
- Stereotypes of British people

== Sources ==
- Ward, Michael (2003), "The California Movement, etc." ( (PDF)), Portland Dialect Study: The Fronting of /ow, u, uw/ in Portland, Oregon, Portland State University, pp. 39–45, archived from the original on July 29, 2007
