= Nation of shopkeepers =

Expression describing England or the United Kingdom

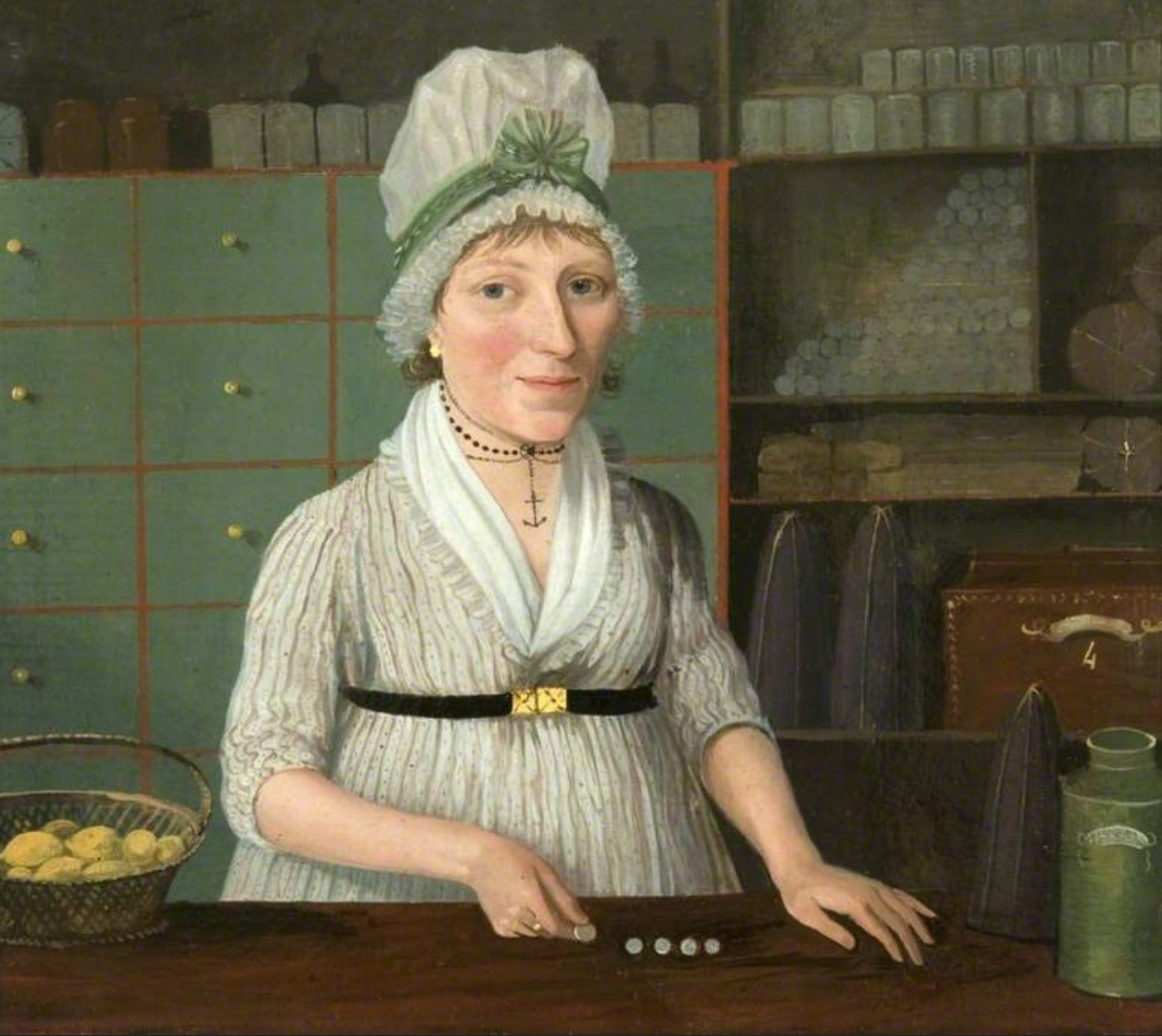
The Woman Shopkeeper, British School, c. 1790-1800

The phrase "nation of shopkeepers" is an expression used to refer to England or the United Kingdom. It is often attributed to Napoleon, though this claim is disputed and earlier occurrences exist.

== Attribution to Napoleon ==
There is reason to doubt that Napoleon ever used the phrase. No contemporaneous French newspaper mentions that he did. The phrase was first used in a derogatory sense by French revolutionary Bertrand Barère on 11 June 1794 in a speech to the National Convention: "Let Pitt then boast of his victory to his nation of shopkeepers". Barère was referring to the British victory over the French at the Glorious First of June. Later, during the Napoleonic wars, the British press mentioned the phrase, attributing it either to "the French" or to Napoleon himself.

A later, explicit source is Barry O'Meara, who was surgeon to Napoleon during his exile in St. Helena. If O'Meara is to be believed, Napoleon said:

Your meddling in continental affairs, and trying to make yourselves a great military power, instead of attending to the sea and commerce, will yet be your ruin as a nation. You were greatly offended with me for having called you a nation of shopkeepers. Had I meant by this, that you were a nation of cowards, you would have had reason to be displeased; even though it were ridiculous and contrary to historical facts; but no such thing was ever intended. I meant that you were a nation of merchants, and that all your great riches, and your grand resources arose from commerce, which is true. What else constitutes the riches of England. It is not extent of territory, or a numerous population. It is not mines of gold, silver, or diamonds. Moreover, no man of sense ought to be ashamed of being called a shopkeeper. But your prince and your ministers appear to wish to change altogether l'esprit of the English, and to render you another nation; to make you ashamed of your shops and your trade, which have made you what you are, and to sigh after nobility, titles and crosses; in fact to assimilate you with the French... You are all nobility now, instead of the plain old Englishmen.

There may be grounds to doubt the veracity of this account.

The supposed French original as uttered by Napoleon (une nation de boutiquiers) is frequently cited, but it has no attestation. O'Meara routinely conversed with Napoleon in Italian, not French. There is no other source.

After the war English newspapers sometimes tried to correct the impression. For example the following article appeared in the Morning Post of 28 May 1832:

ENGLAND A NATION OF SHOPKEEPERS This complimentary term, for so we must consider it, as applied to a Nation which has derived its principal prosperity from its commercial greatness, has been erroneously attributed, from time to time, to all the leading Revolutionists of France. To our astonishment we now find it applied exclusively to BONAPARTE. Than this nothing can be further from the fact. NAPOLEON was scarcely known at the time, he being merely an Officer of inferior rank, totally unconnected with politics. The occasion on which that splenetic, but at the same time, complimentary observation was made was that of the ever-memorable battle of the 1st of June. The oration delivered on that occasion was by M. BARRERE [sic], in which, after describing our beautiful country as one "on which the sun scarce designs to shed its light", he described England as a nation of shopkeepers.

== Historical context ==
Napoleon would have been correct in seeing the United Kingdom as essentially a commercial and naval rather than a land-based power, but during his lifetime it was fast being transformed from a mercantile to an industrial nation, a process which laid the basis for a century of British hegemony after the Battle of Waterloo. Although the UK had half the population of France during the Napoleonic Wars, there was a higher per capita income and, consequently, enough of a tax base to conduct a prolonged war of attrition. The United Kingdom's economy and its ability to finance the war against Napoleon also benefitted from the Bank of England's issuance of inconvertible banknotes, a "temporary" measure which remained from the 1790s until 1821.

== Origin of phrase ==
The phrase may have been part of standard 18th-century economic dialogue. It has been suggested that Napoleon may have heard it during a meeting of the French Convention on 11 June 1794, when Barère quoted Adam Smith. But this presupposes that Napoleon himself, as opposed to Barère alone, used the phrase.

In any case the phrase did not originate with Napoleon, or even Barère. It first appears in a non-pejorative sense in The Wealth of Nations (1776) by Smith, who wrote:

To found a great empire for the sole purpose of raising up a people of customers may at first sight appear a project fit only for a nation of shopkeepers. It is, however, a project altogether unfit for a nation of shopkeepers; but extremely fit for a nation whose government is influenced by shopkeepers.

— Adam Smith, The Wealth of Nations

Smith is also quoted as saying that Britain was "a nation that is governed by shopkeepers", which is how he put it in the first (1776) edition. It is unlikely that either Adam Smith or Napoleon used the phrase to describe that class of small retailers who would not even have had the franchise.

The phrase has also been attributed to Samuel Adams, but this is disputed; Josiah Tucker, Dean of Gloucester, produced a slightly different phrase in 1766:

And what is true of a shopkeeper is true of a shopkeeping nation.

Benjamin Franklin used a similar idea about Holland in a letter to Charles W. F. Dumas on 6 August 1781:

Some writer, I forget who, says that Holland is no longer a nation but a great shop and I begin to think it has no other principles or sentiments but those of a shopkeeper.

== Reappropriation ==
William Makepeace Thackeray turned the phrase back onto the continent in his classic Vanity Fair (1847–1848), albeit satirizing the Belgians rather than the French. In chapter XXVIII, in which the Duke of Wellington's army lands in Ostend in the lead up to the Battle of Waterloo, Thackeray states:

It may be said as a rule, that every Englishman in the Duke of Wellington's army paid his way. The remembrance of such a fact surely becomes a nation of shopkeepers.

Margaret Thatcher used the phrase in an interview to the press on 18 February 1975:

We used to be famous for two things—as a nation of shopkeepers and as the workshop of the world. One is trade, the other is industry. We must get back our reputation.
