= Styrian Table of Peoples =

18th-century oil painting and written table

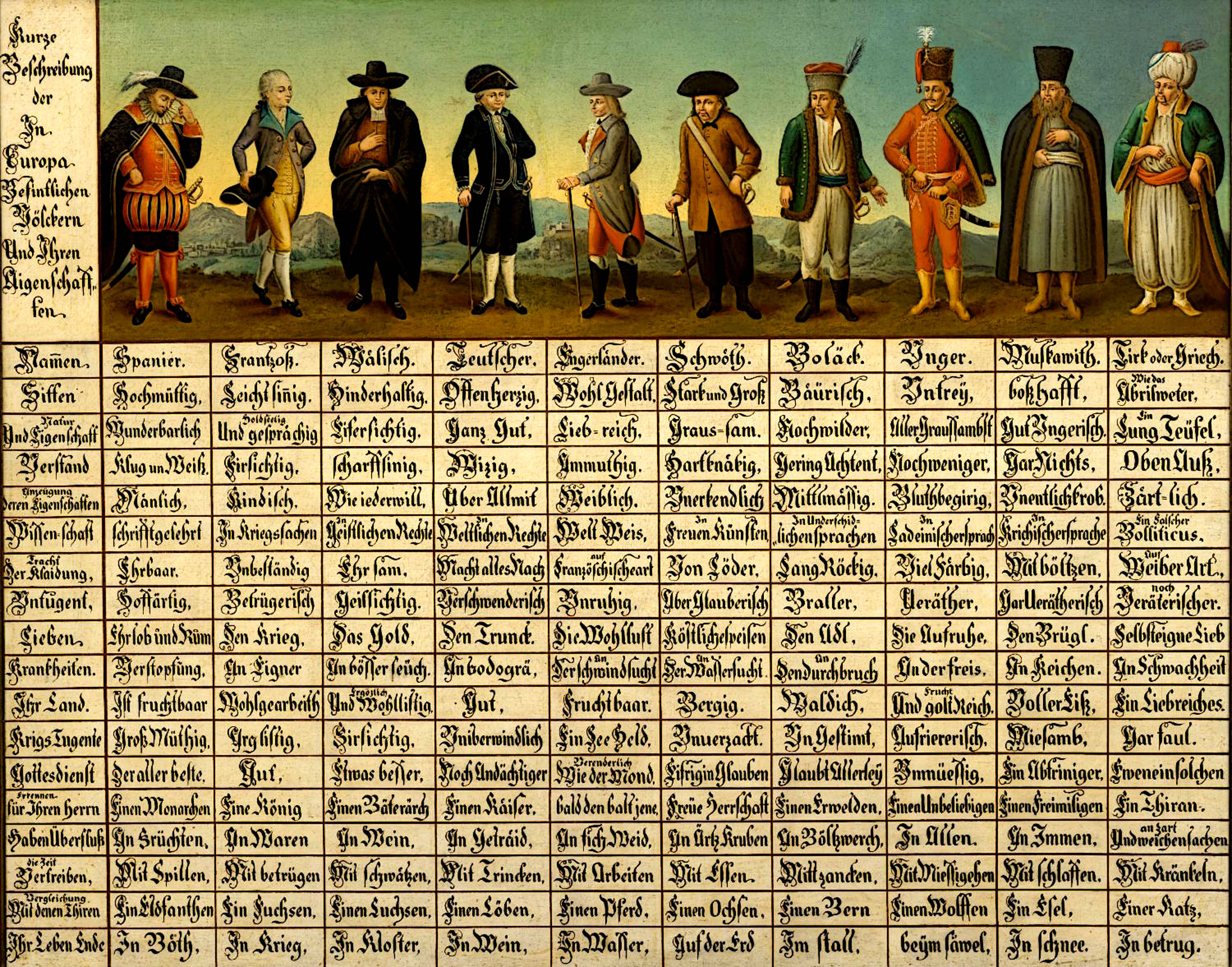
The Völkertafel

The Styrian Table of Peoples (German: Steirische Völkertafel) is an early 18th-century oil painting which shows stereotypical depictions of 10 different European peoples above a table of their purported characteristics. The painting provides an example of historic ethnic stereotypes.

== Origin ==
The painter of the Völkertafel is unknown, as is its exact date of creation, but it is assumed to have been painted in the Styria region of Austria in the early 1700s. There are at least six copies, and it is not possible to tell which is the original. The Völkertafel was likely based on a 1720 engraving by Joseph Friedrich Leopold.

Of the 6 known extant copies, 3 are held at the Austrian Museum of Folk Life and Folk Art in Vienna, and the other 3 are held at museums in Bad Aussee, Moosham and Kloster Machern.

== Content and analysis ==
The top of the table shows 10 figures, which correspond the countries of Spain, France, Italy, Germany, England, Sweden, Poland, Hungarian, Russia and Turkey/Greece. The table shows 17 characteristics such as manners, intellect or vices and charts how the people of the 10 nations correspond to these characteristics. The descriptions are harsher on the right side of the table, with Turkey/Greece shown in the most negative light.

The table below shows the characteristics assigned to each nation in the Völkertafel, translated into English:

Short description of the peoples found in Europe and their characteristics
	Spaniard	Frenchman	Italian	German	Englishman	Swede	Pole	Hungarian	Russian	Turk or Greek
Appearance	Haughty	Frivolous	Devious	Openhearted	Agreeable	Strong and tall	Boorish	Disloyal	Malicious	(Changes) like April weather
Character and personality	Wondrous	Friendly and talkative	Jealous	Quite good	Charming	Cruel	More cruel	Most cruel	Really Hungarian	A lying devil
Intellect	Clever and wise	Cautious	Sagacious	Shrewd	Graceful	Adamant	Disdainful	More disdainful	Nothing	Pretentious
Traits	Manly	Childish	Opportunistic	Imitative	Womanly	Inscrutable	Mediocre	Bloodthirsty	Endlessly rude	Tender
Sciences	Theology	Warfare	Canon law	Jurisprudence	Geography	Liberal arts	Languages	Latin	Greek	Political treachery
National dress	Respectable	Variable	Modest	Imitates others	After French fashion	Leather	Long coats	Multicoloured	Furs	Effeminate
Vices	Vain	Deceitful	Covetous	Prodigal	Restless	Superstitious	Hoggish	Treacherous	More treacherous	Most treacherous
Preferences	Honour and Glory	War	Gold	Drinking	Pleasures	Expensive food	Nobility	Rebellion	Beating	Narcissism
Diseases	Constipation	Syphilis	Plague	Podagra	Consumption	Dropsy	Diarrhea	Epilepsy	Whooping cough	Exhaustion
Their countries	Fertile	Well-cultivated	Beautiful and delightful	Good	Fertile	Mountainous	Wooded	Rich in gold and fruit	Icy	Pleasant
War virtues	Generous	Cunning	Cautious	Invincible	Heroic at sea	Undaunted	Impetuous	Insurgent	Cumbersome	Lazy
Piety	Outstanding	Good	A tad better	Very pious	Changeable like the moon	Zealous	Believes all sorts of things	Energetic	An infidel	The same
Their master	A monarch	A king	A patriarch	An emperor	Now one, now another	Liberal	An elected one	A chosen one	A volunteer	A tyrant
Superfluity in	Fruit	Commodities	Wine	Grain	Pastures	Iron-ore mines	Furs	Everything	Bees	Soft things
Pastimes	Games	Cheating	Gossiping	Drinking	Working	Eating	Arguing	Idleness	Sleeping	Being ill
Equivalent animal	Elephant	Fox	Lynx	Lion	Horse	Ox	Bear	Wolf	Donkey	Cat
Lives end	In bed	In battle	In the monastery	In wine	In water	On the ground	In the stable	By sabre	In the snow	In fraud

== Sources ==
- Janžekovič, Izidor (2022). "Ethnic 'stereotypes' in early modern Europe:Russian and Ottoman national costumes". History and Anthropology. 35 (3): 500–524. doi:10.1080/02757206.2022.2132494. hdl:20.500.14018/13905.
- Kordel, Jacek (2021). "Boläck: Noch wilder als der grausame Schwöth. Über die Vorbilder und Quellen des Polenbildes in der Steirischen Völkertafel". Österreichische Zeitschrift für Volkskunde. 1 (124): 37–64.
- Paulus, Dagmar (2020). "Femininity, Nation, and Nature: Fanny Tarnow's Letters to Friends from a Journey to Petersburg (1819)". In Paulus, Dagmar; Pilsworth, Ellen (eds.). Nationalism Before the Nation State : Literary Constructions of Inclusion, Exclusion, and Self-Definition (1756-1871). Brill. pp. 77–96. ISBN 9789004366831.
