= Steven D. Hollon =

American psychologist, academic and researcher

- Born: 1949 (age 76–77); Washington, D.C.
- Occupations: Psychologist and academic researcher
- Title: Gertrude Conaway Vanderbilt Professor of Psychology
- Spouse: Judy Garber

Academic background
- Education: BA, Psychology and Anthropology (1971); MSc, Clinical Psychology (1974); PhD, Clinical Psychology (1977)
- Alma mater: George Washington University; Florida State University
- Doctoral advisor: Aaron Beck

Academic work
- Institutions: University of Minnesota; Vanderbilt University

Steven D. Hollon (born 1949) is an American psychologist, academic and researcher. He is the Gertrude Conaway Vanderbilt Professor of Psychology at Vanderbilt University.

Hollon's research focuses on the treatment and prevention of depression with a particular emphasis on cognitive therapy in comparison to antidepressant medications. His research (mostly in collaboration with Robert J. DeRubeis) has found that cognitive therapy is as efficacious and more enduring than antidepressant medications in the treatment of unipolar depression. That cognitive therapy has an enduring effect is perhaps his major contribution; studies dating to the early 1980s have found that treating patients with cognitive therapy cuts risk for relapse by more than half following relative to medication treatment following treatment termination and is at least as efficacious as keeping patients on antidepressant medications. He has over 300 publications and has mentored over 20 doctoral and post-doctoral advisees.

== Early life ==
Hollon was born in 1949 in Washington DC. He received a B.A. in Psychology and Anthropology in 1971 from George Washington University. He completed his graduate training at the Florida State University where he worked with Jack Hokanson. He received a M.Sc. in Clinical Psychology in 1974 and a Ph.D. in Clinical Psychology in 1977. It was in graduate school that he developed his interest in the nature and treatment of depression with a particular emphasis on work by Aaron T. Beck (cognitive theory and therapy), Martin E. P. Seligman (learned helplessness), and Gerald Klerman (controlled clinical trials).

After his third year in graduate school with dissertation data in hand, Hollon followed his future wife Judy Garber to Philadelphia where she had gone earlier that year to work with Martin Seligman (an informal mentor to Hollon as well). Hollon got the opportunity to work with Aaron T. Beck, the progenitor of cognitive therapy, who became his primary mentor. The following year, Hollon went through the psychiatric residency program at University of Pennsylvania to broaden his exposure to other interventions. During his time in Philadelphia, his primary mentor Beck introduced him to his third mentor Gerald Klerman, a major proponent of controlled clinical trials.

== Career ==
Hollon joined the faculty at the University of Minnesota as an assistant professor of psychology in 1977 and was promoted with tenure to the rank of associate professor three years later in 1980. Hollon connected early with Robert DeRubeis and has collaborated with him on multiple studies over the course of his career. In 1985, Hollon moved to Vanderbilt University where he was promoted to Full Professor in 1988. In 2011, he was named the Gertrude Conaway Vanderbilt Professor of Psychology.

He is the former Editor of Cognitive Therapy and Research and Associate Editor of the Journal of Abnormal Psychology. He is a past President of Association for Behavioral and Cognitive Therapies (ABCT), the Society for a Science of Clinical Psychology (SSCP), and the first chair of the steering committee advising the American Psychological Association on clinical practice guidelines.

== Research interests ==
Since the beginning of his career, Hollon's work has been focused on depression and its treatment. His work extends from basic psychopathology to prevention and treatment. When he moved to Philadelphia to work with Beck in the mid-1970s, he joined a group that was studying the effectiveness of cognitive behavioral therapy (CBT) for the treatment of depression. Beck and colleagues, Augustus John Rush and Maria Kovacs completed the first controlled trial to suggest that a psychosocial intervention could at least hold its own with medications and had an enduring effect that medications simply lacked.

After he moved to Minnesota, he and DeRubeis conducted a clinical trial that again showed that CBT was as efficacious as adequately implemented antidepressant medications and once again more enduring. Continuing to work together, Hollon and DeRubeis conducted two more randomized controlled trials. The first showed that CBT is as efficacious as antidepressant medications for even more severe depressions and once again more enduring. The second trial found that adding CBT to medications enhanced recovery in a moderated fashion (only non-chronic patients with more severe depressions benefitted) although at the expense of CBT's enduring effect. Hollon has contributed to four of the seven trials (out of eight total) that have found prior cognitive therapy has an enduring effect relative to antidepressant medications following treatment termination.

In 2006, Hollon joined with Sona Dimidjian in the aftermath of Neil Jacobson’s untimely death to bring a placebo-controlled trial to closure that found behavioral activation as efficacious as medications and as enduring as CBT. A subsequent trial in rural India conducted by Vikram Patel indicated that a brief 6 to 8 session culturally adapted version of behavioral activation called the Healthy Activity Program (HAP) conducted by non-professional lay counselors was more efficacious than enhanced usual care among depressed patients in primary care with little indication of relapse over the nine months following treatment termination.

With Cox, Abramson, and Devine, he argued that models of depressive cognitions could be adapted to the study of prejudice and stereotyping, and vice versa. This work provided a foundation to develop effective intervention methods to reduce intergroup biases, adapted from CBT, including the bias habit-breaking training.

Hollon's studies have suggested that the specificity of treatment response is heavily moderated; only patients with more severe depressions show a "true drug" response relative to pill-placebo and the same appears to be true for psychotherapy. Change in cognition appears to drive change in depression in cognitive therapy while the opposite pattern obtains in medication treatment whereas acquisition of skills and change in underlying core beliefs appears to mediate the enduring effects found for cognitive therapy. His recent interests have gravitated toward optimizing treatment selection (moderation), global mental health, and evolutionary theory with respect to depression.

== Personal life ==
Hollon is married to Judy Garber, a developmental psychopathologist, who is the Cornelius Vanderbilt Professor of Psychology and Human Development at Vanderbilt University. Garber does work on risk for depression and more recently its prevention in at-risk adolescents. Their son Nicholas Garber Hollon is a neuroscientist.

== Awards and honors ==
- 2002 - George A. Miller Award Outstanding Article American Psychological Association (APA)
- 2003 - Distinguished Scientist Award Society for a Science of Clinical Psychology (SSCP)
- 2007 - Alexander Heard Distinguished Service Professor Award Vanderbilt University
- 2010 - Distinguished Scientific Contribution to Clinical Psychology, Society of Clinical Psychology (Div 12), American Psychological Association
- 2011 - Florence Halpern Award for Distinguished Professional Contribution to Clinical Psychology - Society of Clinical Psychology (Div 12) American Psychological Association (APA)
- 2012 - Award for Excellence in Graduate Teaching, Vanderbilt University
- 2016 - Joseph Zubin Award for Lifetime Contributions to the Understanding of Psychopathology from the Society for Research in Psychopathology (SRP)
- 2019 - Honoree – Federation of Associations in Behavioral and Brain Sciences
- 2019 - Patron – Charlie Waller Memorial Trust
- 2020 - Distinguished Scientific Award for the Applications of Psychology – American Psychological Association (APA)
