= Learned helplessness =

Psychological behavior

Learned helplessness is the behavior exhibited by a subject after enduring repeated aversive stimuli beyond their control. In humans, learned helplessness is related to the concept of self-efficacy, the individual's belief in their innate ability to achieve goals.

Learned helplessness theory is the view that clinical depression and related mental illnesses may result from a real or perceived absence of control over the outcome of a situation.

== Foundation of research and theory ==
Learned helplessness was initially thought to be a subject's acceptance of their powerlessness following repeated exposure to an aversive stimulus that was difficult to avoid or escape. It was evidenced by their discontinuing attempts to avoid or escape the stimulus, even when such alternatives were unambiguously presented. Over the past few decades, neuroscience research has shown that the brain's default state is to assume that control is not present. The presence of control is therefore learned. However, it is unlearned when a subject is faced with prolonged aversive stimulation.

=== Early experiments ===
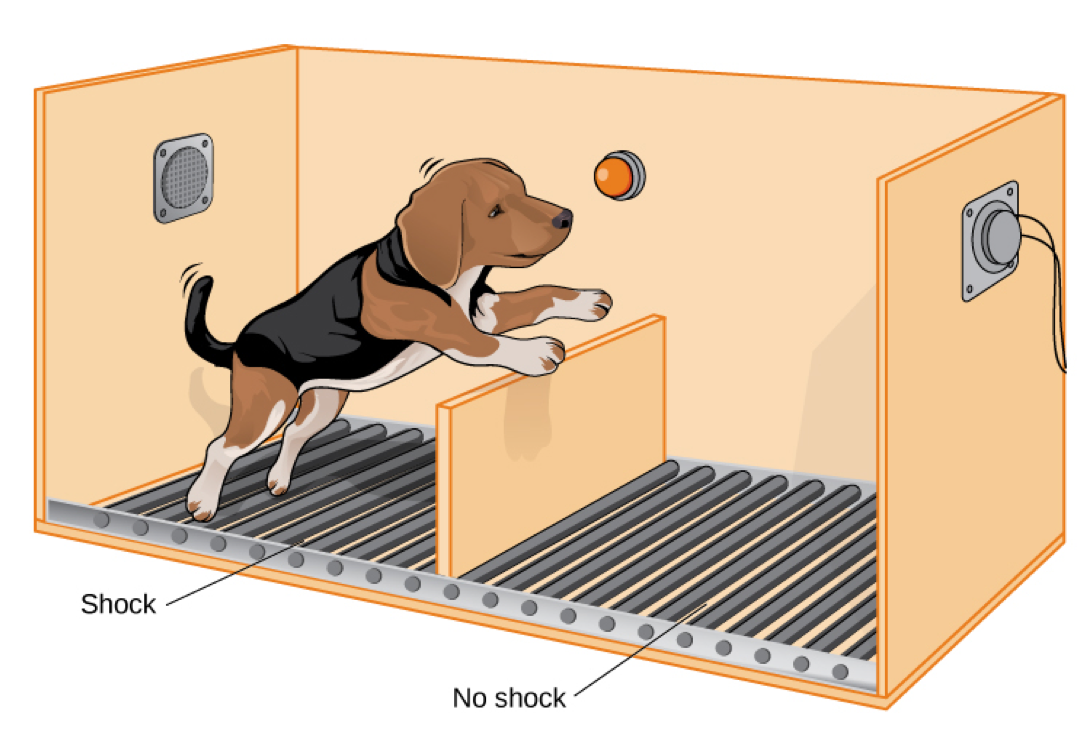
Most of the Group 3 dogs—which had previously learned that nothing they did had any effect on shocks—simply lay down passively and whined when they were shocked

American psychologist Martin Seligman initiated research on learned helplessness in 1967 at the University of Pennsylvania as an extension of his interest in depression. This research was later expanded through experiments by Seligman and others. One of the first was an experiment by Seligman & Overmier: In Part 1 of this study, three groups of dogs were placed in harnesses. Group 1 dogs were simply put in a harness for a period of time and were later released. Groups 2 and 3 consisted of "yoked pairs". Dogs in Group 2 were given electric shocks at random times, which the dog could end by pressing a lever. Each dog in Group 3 was paired with a Group 2 dog; whenever a Group 2 dog got a shock, its paired dog in Group 3 got a shock of the same intensity and duration, but its lever did not stop the shock. To a dog in Group 3, it seemed that the shock ended at random because it was their paired dog in Group 2 that was causing it to stop. Thus, for Group 3 dogs, the shock was "inescapable".

In Part 2 of the experiment, the same three groups of dogs were tested in a shuttle-box apparatus (a chamber containing two rectangular compartments divided by a barrier a few inches high). All of the dogs could escape shocks on one side of the box by jumping over a low partition to the other side. The dogs in Groups 1 and 2 quickly learned this task and escaped the shock. Most of the Group 3 dogs—which had previously learned that nothing they did had any effect on shocks—simply lay down passively and whined when they were shocked.

In a second experiment later that year with new groups of dogs, Maier and Seligman ruled out the possibility that, instead of learned helplessness, the Group 3 dogs failed to avert in the second part of the test because they had learned some behavior that interfered with "escape". To prevent such interfering behavior, Group 3 dogs were immobilized with a paralyzing drug (curare) and underwent a procedure similar to that in Part 1 of the Seligman and Overmier experiment. When tested as before in Part 2, these Group 3 dogs exhibited helplessness as before. This result serves as an indicator for the ruling out of the interference hypothesis.

From these experiments, it was thought that there was to be only one cure for helplessness. In Seligman's hypothesis, the dogs do not try to escape because they expect that nothing they do will stop the shock. To change this expectation, experimenters physically picked up the dogs and moved their legs, replicating the actions the dogs would need to take in order to escape from the electrified grid. This had to be done at least twice before the dogs would start willfully jumping over the barrier on their own. In contrast, threats, rewards, and observed demonstrations had no effect on the "helpless" Group 3 dogs.

=== Later experiments ===
Later experiments have served to confirm the depressive effect of feeling a lack of control over an aversive stimulus. For example, in one experiment, humans performed mental tasks in the presence of distracting noise. Those who could use a switch to turn off the noise performed better than those who could not turn off the noise. Simply being aware of this option was enough to substantially counteract the noise effect. In 2011, an animal study found that animals with control over stressful stimuli exhibited changes in the excitability of certain neurons in the prefrontal cortex. Animals that lacked control failed to exhibit this neural effect and showed signs consistent with learned helplessness and social anxiety. A 1992 study showed that the non-contingency between responses and outcomes when solving chess problems leads to a state of learned helplessness with chess players ranging from weak amateurs to professional players. The effects were proportional to the degree of similarity between the treatment and the task used in the post-test.

== Expanded theories ==
Research has found that a human's reaction to feeling a lack of control differs both between individuals and between situations, i.e., learned helplessness sometimes remains specific to one situation but at other times generalizes across situations. Such variations are not explained by the original theory of learned helplessness, and an influential view is that such variations depend on an individual's attributional or explanatory style. According to this view, how someone interprets or explains adverse events affects their likelihood of acquiring learned helplessness and subsequent depression. For example, people with pessimistic explanatory style tend to see negative events as permanent ("it will never change"), personal ("it's my fault"), and pervasive ("I can't do anything correctly"), and are likely to suffer from learned helplessness and depression.

In 1978, Lyn Yvonne Abramson, Seligman, Paul and John D. Teasdale reformulated Seligman's & Paul's work, using attribution theory. They proposed that people differed in how they classified negative experiences on three scales, from internal to external, stable to unstable, and from global to specific. They believed that people who were more likely to attribute negative events to internal, stable, and global causes were more likely to become depressed than those who attributed things to causes at the other ends of the scales.

Bernard Weiner proposed a detailed account of the attributional approach to learned helplessness in 1986. His attribution theory includes the dimensions of globality/specificity, stability/instability, and internality/externality:

- A global attribution occurs when the individual believes that the cause of negative events is consistent across different contexts.
  - A specific attribution occurs when the individual believes that the cause of a negative event is unique to a particular situation.
- A stable attribution occurs when the individual believes the cause to be consistent across time.
  - An unstable attribution occurs when the individual thinks that the cause is specific to one point in time.
- An external attribution assigns causality to situational or external factors,
  - while an internal attribution assigns causality to factors within the person.

== Neurobiological perspective ==
Research has shown that increased 5-HT (serotonin) activity in the dorsal raphe nucleus plays a critical role in learned helplessness. Other key brain regions that are involved with the expression of helpless behavior include the basolateral amygdala, central nucleus of the amygdala and bed nucleus of the stria terminalis. Activity in medial prefrontal cortex, dorsal hippocampus, septum and hypothalamus has also been observed during states of helplessness.

In the article, "Exercise, Learned Helplessness, and the Stress-Resistant Brain", Benjamin N. Greenwood and Monika Fleshner discuss how exercise might prevent stress-related disorders such as anxiety and depression. They show evidence that running wheel exercise prevents learned helplessness behaviors in rats. They suggest that the amount of exercise may not be as important as simply exercising at all. The article also discusses the neurocircuitry of learned helplessness, the role of serotonin (or 5-HT), and the exercise-associated neural adaptations that may contribute to the stress-resistant brain. However, the authors finally conclude that "The underlying neurobiological mechanisms of this effect, however, remain unknown. Identifying the mechanisms by which exercise prevents learned helplessness could shed light on the complex neurobiology of depression and anxiety and potentially lead to novel strategies for the prevention of stress-related mood disorders".

In developmental psychology the order of various stages of neurobiological development is important. From this perspective there are two different kinds of "helplessness" that appear at different stages of development. In early development, the infant is naturally helpless and must learn "helpfulness" toward mature neurophysiology. The "helplessness" that appears after maturation is what is properly termed "learned helplessness", although some researchers conflate this infantile form of "helplessness" with the pathological, adult, form.

== Health implications ==
People who perceive events as uncontrollable show a variety of symptoms that threaten their mental and physical well-being. They experience stress, they often show disruption of emotions demonstrating passivity or aggressivity, and they can also have difficulty performing cognitive tasks such as problem-solving. They are likely to develop unhealthy patterns of behavior, causing them, for example, to neglect diet, exercise, and medical treatment.

=== Depression ===
Abnormal psychologists and cognitive psychologists have found a strong correlation between depression-like symptoms and learned helplessness in laboratory animals. Steven Maier, a professor at the University of Colorado, states that one model of depression might be caused by "impaired medial prefrontal cortical inhibitory control over stress-responsive limbic and brainstem structures." Comorbidity between many psychological disorders and learned helplessness may be due to stressful events. Similarly, the National Institutes of Health, in 2021, looked at a wide range of depressive models, focusing on the learned helplessness model. They found that the learned helplessness model allows one to predict depressive symptoms because of its high rate of overlap with post-traumatic stress disorder, and major depressive disorder."

Young adults and middle-aged parents with a pessimistic explanatory style often suffer from depression. They tend to be deficient at problem-solving and cognitive restructuring, and demonstrate poor job satisfaction and interpersonal relationships in the workplace. Those with a pessimistic style can have weakened immune systems, including increased vulnerability to minor (e.g., colds) and major health issues (e.g., cancers). It can also cause poor recovery from health problems.

=== Social impact ===
Learned helplessness can be a factor in a wide range of social situations.

- In emotionally abusive relationships, the victim often develops learned helplessness. This occurs when the victim confronts or tries to leave the abuser only to have the abuser dismiss or trivialize the victim's feelings, pretend to care but not change, or impede the victim from leaving. As the situation continues and the abuse gets worse, the victim will begin to give up and show signs of this learned helplessness. This can result in a traumatic bonding with one's victimizer, as in battered woman syndrome or often incorrectly identified as Stockholm syndrome.
- Complex post-traumatic stress disorder.
- Gregory Bateson theorized that schizophrenia is a pattern of learned helplessness in people habitually caught in double binds in childhood. In such cases, the double bind is presented continually and habitually within the family context from infancy on. By the time the child is old enough to have identified the double bind situation, it has already been internalized, and the child is unable to confront it. The solution then is to create an escape from the conflicting logical demands of the double bind, in the world of the delusional system.
- The motivational effect of learned helplessness is often seen in the classroom. Students who repeatedly fail may conclude that they are incapable of improving their performance, and this attribution keeps them from trying to succeed, which results in increased helplessness, continued failure, loss of self-esteem and other social consequences. This becomes a pattern that will spiral downward if it continues to go untreated.
- Child abuse by neglect can be a manifestation of learned helplessness. For example, when parents believe they are incapable of stopping an infant's crying, they may simply give up trying to do anything for the child. This learned helplessness will negatively impact both the parent and child.
- Those who are extremely shy or anxious in social situations may become passive due to feelings of helplessness. Gotlib and Beatty (1985) found that people who cite helplessness in social settings may be viewed poorly by others, which tends to reinforce passivity.
- Aging individuals may respond with helplessness to the deaths of friends and family members, the loss of jobs and income, and the development of age-related health problems. This may cause them to neglect their medical care, financial affairs, and other important needs.
- According to Cox et al., Abramson, Devine, and Hollon (2012), learned helplessness is a key factor in depression that is caused by inescapable prejudice (i.e., "deprejudice"). Thus: "Helplessness born in the face of inescapable prejudice matches the helplessness born in the face of inescapable shocks."
- According to Ruby K. Payne's book A Framework for Understanding Poverty, treatment of the poor can lead to a cycle of poverty, a culture of poverty, and generational poverty. This type of learned helplessness is passed from parents to children. People who embrace this mentality feel there is no way to escape poverty and so one must live in the moment and not plan for the future, trapping families in poverty.
- Wealth inequality has an impact on mental health.

Social problems resulting from learned helplessness may seem unavoidable to those entrenched. However, there are various ways to reduce or prevent it. When induced in experimental settings, learned helplessness has been shown to resolve itself with the passage of time. People can be immunized against the perception that events are uncontrollable by increasing their awareness of previous experiences, when they were able to affect the desired outcome. Cognitive therapy can be used to show people that their actions do make a difference and bolster their self-esteem. Seeking out these types of treatment options can be extremely helpful for people stuck in a rut when it comes to learned helplessness. While it may initially feel hard to escape, with the proper time and help, it can get better.

== Extensions ==
Cognitive scientist and usability engineer Donald Norman used learned helplessness to explain why people blame themselves when they have a difficult time using simple objects in their environment.

The U.S. sociologist Harrison White has suggested in his book Identity and Control that the notion of learned helplessness can be extended beyond psychology into the realm of social action. When a culture or political identity fails to achieve desired goals, perceptions of collective ability suffer.

== Emergence under torture ==
Studies on learned helplessness served as the basis for developing American torture methods. In CIA interrogation manuals, learned helplessness is characterized as "apathy" which may result from prolonged use of coercive techniques which result in a "debility-dependency-dread" state in the subject, "If the debility-dependency-dread state is unduly prolonged, however, the arrestee may sink into a defensive apathy from which it is hard to arouse him."

== See also ==
- Agency (psychology)
- Anomie
- Behavioral theories of depression
- Conflict avoidance
- Defeatism
- Depression
- Depressive realism
- Fundamental attribution error
- Gaslighting
- Learned industriousness
- Learned optimism
- Locus of control
- Pervasive refusal syndrome
- Pit of despair
- Self-handicapping
- Somebody else's problem
- Stockholm syndrome
- Spiral of silence
- Victim playing
