= Automatic negative thoughts =

Uncontrolled negative thoughts about one's self

Automatic negative thoughts (ANT) are thoughts that are negative and random in nature in reference to one’s self and occur without volitional or conscious control.

== Measures ==
The Automatic Thoughts Questionnaire 30 (ATQ 30) is a scientific questionnaire created by Steven D. Hollon and Phillip C. Kendall that measures automatic negative thoughts. The ATQ 30 consists of 30 negative statements and asks participants to indicate how often they experienced the negative thought during the course of the week on a scale of 1–5 (1=Low-High=5). This measure was created in response to Aaron T. Beck’s hypothesis that thinking in depressed populations tends to be negative. Example statements include "I'm worthless", "I've let people down", "I can't get started" and "My future is bleak".

== Depression ==
It has been suggested in some studies that depression is associated with having increased levels of automatic negative thoughts. Additionally, the extent of automatic negative thoughts experienced is associated with depression severity.

== Social anxiety disorder ==
In this disorder, people experience a high degree of fear and avoidance of social situations. There has not been much research conducted to date on the association between automatic thoughts and social anxiety disorder. However, one study by Iancu and colleagues attempted to evaluate a possible relationship. They proposed a possible relationship because of the distorted thinking that occurs with social anxiety disorder. In their study, the researchers selected a group of individuals who were diagnosed with social anxiety disorder, and then administered them automatic thought questionnaires. The study found that people with higher levels of automatic negative thoughts were more likely to show more fear and avoidance. In addition, levels of automatic thoughts that were measured were correlated with severity of symptoms.

== Reducing automatic negative thoughts ==
=== Mindfulness ===
Mindfulness is a technique used to help people focus on the present moment, thereby helping in restructuring distorted thoughts and feelings. Some studies suggest that mindfulness reduces automatic negative thinking. Ritvo and colleagues found that university students going through a series of mindfulness courses had an overall group reduction in automatic negative thoughts.

== See also ==
- Social anxiety disorder
- Depression (mood)
- Major depressive disorder
- Cognitive distortion
- Cognitive behavioral therapy
