= Learned industriousness =

Behavioral theory by Robert Eisenberger

Learned industriousness is a behaviorally rooted theory developed by Robert Eisenberger to explain the differences in general work effort among people of equivalent ability. According to Eisenberger, individuals who are reinforced for exerting high effort on a task are also secondarily reinforced by the sensation of high effort. Individuals with a history of reinforcement for effort are predicted to generalize this effort to new behaviors.

== Operationalization of industriousness ==
An individual is considered industrious if he or she demonstrates perseverance and determination in performing a task. This term has also been used interchangeably with work ethic, which is generally regarded as the attitude that hard work and effort is virtuous. Learned industriousness theory asserts that industriousness is developed over time through a history of reinforcement.

== Possible relationship to learned helplessness ==
Learned helplessness is a term to explain a specific pattern of behavior that occurs in both animals and humans. When an animal or human is consistently exposed to an aversive condition (pain, unpleasant noise, etc.) and is unable to escape this condition, that animal or human will become helpless and stop attempting escape. The animal or human may develop motivational deficits, as demonstrated in learned helplessness experiments. In contrast, learned industriousness theory attempts to explain why some individuals are more motivated than others. In an attempt to merge these two phenomena, Eisenberger, Park, & Frank invoked learned industriousness in children by providing task-contingent verbal approval for a small group of behaviors, contrasting outcomes between a group of children conditioned to exhibit learned helplessness and a control group. On a subsequent approval-contingent task, children conditioned by task-contingent verbal approval outperformed controls. However, the learned-helplessness group performed no differently from controls.

== Antecedents of industriousness ==
=== Effort ===
Effort is the subjective experience of fatigue felt by the body when it is in motion or meets resistance. This fatigue can refer to both physical and mental fatigue depending on the task at hand. Until the theory of learned industriousness, effort was generally considered an aversive sensation. Hull summed up this concept with the Law of Least Effort, which asserts that individuals will choose a solution that minimizes effort for any given problem. Learned industriousness theory is considered an addendum to the Law of Least Effort.

==== Relationship between effort and goal-setting strategies ====
Individuals with high levels of industriousness have a history of applying great effort towards tasks. It has been demonstrated in many studies that different uses of goals result in more effort and task persistence. Thus, specific goal-setting strategies are antecedents to effort and subsequently increase the likelihood of an individual 'learning' industriousness. Below is an overview of the findings.

A goal is defined as the "object or aim of an action". As motivational tools, goals have been shown to improve performance in a wide variety of settings. For example, one study looked at the effects of high goals versus low goals on performance. To investigate this effect, students were given goals for a brainstorming activity; those with higher goals were able to brainstorm more ideas than those with lower goals. Therefore, the investigator concluded that goal setting not only increases performance, but more ambitious goals evoke better performance than lower-set goals.

In addition to improving performance, setting goals also increases task effort and persistence. In one study, participants were assigned to three groups: short-term goals, long-term goals, and a control group with no goals. The participants were then asked to attempt a complicated mirror maze as many times as they would like. Both groups with goals persisted on the maze task significantly longer than the control group, providing evidence that goals promote higher effort and persistence.

Another facet of goals that has been studied in relation to task persistence is whether the goal is a cooperative or competitive goal structure. A cooperative goal structure is one in which an individual must work alongside a group to reach a common goal, whereas a competitive goal structure is one in which an individual competes with others to reach a goal. The investigators tested whether participants' social values (cooperativeness, competitiveness, and individualism) moderate the relationship between goal structure and task persistence. In accordance with their hypotheses, individuals who were classified as "cooperators" persisted longer on the cooperative goal-structured task than the competitive goal-structured task. Similarly, individuals who were classified as "individualists" persisted longer on a competitive goal-structured task than a cooperative one. Therefore, the investigators conclude that the effect of "cooperative versus competitive goal structures on task persistence are influenced by individuals' social values and history of rewarded effort".

==== Relationship between effort and task interest/difficulty ====
There are certain aspects of tasks that induce greater effort and persistence: a performer's interest in the task and the level of difficulty of the task. These factors are relevant in creating an environment where an individual is likely to exert more effort and, in turn, become more industrious. Therefore, task interest and task difficulty may both act as moderators in the relationship between effort and industriousness.

Task interest, or an individual's engagement in an activity, is claimed to be an antecedent to the exertion of effort on a task. In a study by Fisher & Noble, the hypothesis that task interest is important for self-regulation during performance and task effort was empirically tested. The findings suggest that task interest positively predicted effort with a significant correlation. While a significant correlation cannot prove causation, there is evidence that higher effort is linked to higher intrinsic motivation. Other studies have supported this finding as well.

Task difficulty is also suggested to precede high effort. The reasoning behind this claim is that high difficulty tasks evoke high effort exertion if the individual is motivated to succeed on the task. The study conducted by Fisher and Noble also supports this hypothesis, as a significant positive relationship between task difficulty and effort was found.

=== Reinforcement ===
According to Daniels & Daniels, reinforcement is any stimulus, event, or situation that fulfills the following two requirements:

1. Follows a behavior
2. Increases the frequency of that behavior

A stimulus, event, or situation is considered a reinforcer if it follows a targeted behavior and causes the increased occurrence of that behavior. Many confuse the terms "reward" and "reinforcer" because they often mean the same thing; a reward is given as a consequence of a desired behavior and often motivates an individual to perform that behavior again in order to receive another reward. However, individuals can receive rewards and not increase the behavior in question (e.g., receiving a prize for completing a marathon may not motivate an individual to run more marathons). In that case, the reward is not a reinforcer because it does not increase the frequency of the behavior. Positive reinforcement is any stimulus that is presented after a behavior and increases the frequency of that behavior. Negative reinforcement is the removal of an aversive stimulus after a behavior that increases the frequency of that behavior. Both positive and negative reinforcement are effective in the development of industriousness.

==== Reinforcing high effort ====
Learned industriousness theory asserts that reinforcing an individual for achieving a performance standard increases the likelihood of that individual's performing those behaviors again. If the individual exerted high levels of effort during the completion of the task, the effort takes on its own reinforcing value. This is because the individual enjoys the sensation of working hard because it is associated with reinforcement. Therefore, this individual is more likely to generalize this high level of effort to other tasks because it is less aversive and is associated with positive results. On the other hand, the theory also claims that if an individual has a history of being reinforced for completing tasks with very low levels of effort, that individual will eventually generalize this low level of effort to other tasks. This facet of the theory is termed "learned laziness." Evidence for these claims is provided below.

Eisenberger's theory claims an essentially dichotomous relationship between effort and reinforcement: the exertion of low effort on a simple tasked paired with high levels of reinforcement will result in low levels of effort on future tasks; on the other hand, the exertion of high effort on a difficult task paired with low levels of reinforcement (intermittent reinforcement) will result in high levels of effort on future tasks. A study conducted by Drucker et al. showed support for this claim. In this study, participants were randomly assigned to computer tasks that ranged in level of difficulty and then given either high or low levels of reinforcement for performance on the task. Participants then were given an anagram task on which their persistence time was measured. In accordance with Eisenberger's theory, individuals who were highly reinforced for performance on the low-difficulty computer task spent less time persisting on the subsequent anagram task, demonstrating that the low level of effort generalized to another activity. Additionally, individuals who were given low levels of reinforcement for performance on the moderately high-difficulty computer task spent more time persisting on the anagram task. This demonstrated that the effort exerted on the first task, paired with low levels of reinforcement, generalized to the following task. However, participants who were given the highest-difficulty computer tasks did not generalize this effort. According to the researchers, this version of the task was so difficult that the participants could not succeed and thus demonstrated a pattern of behaviors similar to learned helplessness.

== Consequences ==
=== Increased effort ===
In addition to being an antecedent to industriousness, effort is the foremost consequence of learned industriousness theory. As predicted by the theory, multiple experimental studies have demonstrated increased effort when paired with reinforcement.

Pierce, Cameron, Banko, and So conducted two studies in directly testing Eisenberger's theory. Mimicking Drucker's methodology, the authors placed participants in a task that was of either constant or progressively higher difficulty and then either rewarded for completing the task or not rewarded (a 2x2 experiment). Afterwards the participants were presented with a difficult free-choice task. Participants who were in the progressive difficulty-reward condition spent more time on the free-choice task, especially compared to the constant difficulty-reward condition (who spent the least amount of time). A year later, Cameron, Pierce, and So repeated the experiment, this time with an easy/difficult task condition split instead of a constant/progressive difficulty condition split. Not only did participants in the difficult-reward condition put forth more effort in the free-choice phase, the authors found that participants who were rewarded for completing the difficult task performed better on the free choice task than those who were not rewarded. Additionally, participants who were rewarded for completing the easy task performed worse on the free choice task than those who were not rewarded.

Another similar study found that the secondary effort reinforcement, both positive and negative, is equally transferable to tasks other than the one originally used in the conditioning.

== Applications ==
=== Creativity ===
There have been many studies looking at the links between creativity and rewards. Many argue that if students are rewarded for a task such as creativity, they will be less interested, perform worse, and enjoy the task less once the reward is removed. Eisenberger applied his learned industriousness theory to studies of creativity to show that extrinsic rewards do not always negatively affect intrinsic motivation or creativity.

Using a similar training, Eisenberger and Selbst performed a series of experiments looking at whether creativity and divergent thought could be conditioned in the same manner as effort. Participants performed a task where they pulled letters out of a long word to create different words and were either given a performance standard (high difficulty condition) or no performance standard (low difficulty condition). After completing five rounds of words, the participants were instructed to make as many unique drawings from a circle as they could. The pictures were judged for uniqueness and general creativity.

The authors found similar results to previous learned industriousness studies: participants in the high difficulty-low reward condition showed more creativity in the circle drawing task than those without a reward while participants in the low difficulty-low reward showed even less creativity. Although most creativity research up until that point suggested that any reward for creative thoughts reduced generalized creativity, this study showed that increases or decreases in generalized creativity depend on whether or not high or low divergent thought is rewarded.

=== Smoking/drug habits ===
Currently the area of study that learned industriousness has been cited in the applied world is smoking and drug cessation research. An example of such research is Quinn et al.'s correlational study which examined the levels of persistence of smokers vs. non-smokers using the Anagram Persistence Task (APT) and the Mirror-Tracing Persistence Task (MTPT). As predicted, non-smokers had higher levels of persistence than smokers. The authors suggested that people who have been reinforced with high effort throughout their lives would be more persistent in their use of strategies for coping with stress than smokers and that people reinforced with low effort would be more likely to use low effort strategies when coping with stress (such as smoking). In addition, people with low persistence are less likely to produce the high effort behaviors required to quit smoking. Adding support to Brandon et al.'s hypotheses is a study by Brown, Lejuez, Kahler, & Strong. The authors found that smokers who have never been able to quit for more than a day had lower levels of persistence than those who were able to quit for at least 3 months at a time.

Another study by Brandon, Herzog, Juliano, Irvin, Lazev, & Simmons continued the work of the previous two by using a longitudinal perspective. After testing for persistence using the APT and the MTPT, the participants went through eleven days of smoking cessation therapy that included cognitive-behavioral therapy, training on coping strategies, and nicotine replacement therapy. Participants were then contacted on a monthly basis for 6 months and then at 9 and 12 months for updates on their smoking habits. In addition to supporting previous findings that smokers perform worse on persistence tasks, participants who scored higher on the persistence tasks were less likely to relapse during the 12-month period of the study. Although the study was again limited because of its correlational design, the authors suggest that their results fit within the theoretical framework of learned industriousness.

An additional study by Steinberg et al. looking at adolescents and smoking found much of the same results as Brandon et al. Non-smoking adolescents scored higher on a self-reported persistence measure than smokers and smokers who planned on quitting scored higher than those who did not plan on quitting.

== Future research ==
There are several areas in which the literature on learned industriousness can be expanded. Due to the unclear results of Eisenberger's study of a Learned Industriousness-Learned Helplessness Continuum, further research should be done to provide evidence for or against its existence. This research could be useful for personnel selection purposes and understanding performance in the workplace. Also, the most current smoking-related learned industriousness research has been correlational; experimental studies could not only be powerful evidence for the theory but also generate important practical contributions for smoking cessation therapy.

== See also ==
- Creativity
- Learned helplessness
- Motivation
- Operant conditioning
- Persistence (psychology)
- Reward system
