= Depressive realism =

Hypothesis about depression

Depressive realism is the hypothesis developed by Lauren Alloy and Lyn Yvonne Abramson that depressed individuals make more realistic inferences than non-depressed individuals. Although depressed individuals are thought to have a negative cognitive bias that results in recurrent, negative automatic thoughts, maladaptive behaviors, and dysfunctional world beliefs, depressive realism argues not only that this negativity may reflect a more accurate appraisal of the world but also that non-depressed individuals' appraisals are positively biased.

== Evidence for ==
When participants were asked to press a button and rate the control they perceived they had over whether or not a light turned on, depressed individuals made more accurate ratings of control than non-depressed individuals. Among participants asked to complete a task and rate their performance without any feedback, depressed individuals made more accurate self-ratings than non-depressed individuals. For participants asked to complete a series of tasks, given feedback on their performance after each task, and who self-rated their overall performance after completing all the tasks, depressed individuals were again more likely to give an accurate self-rating than non-depressed individuals. When asked to evaluate their performance both immediately and some time after completing a task, depressed individuals made accurate appraisals both immediately before and after time had passed.

In a functional magnetic resonance imaging study of the brain, depressed patients were shown to be more accurate in their causal attributions of positive and negative social events than non-depressed participants, who demonstrated a positive bias. This difference was also reflected in the differential activation of the fronto-temporal network, higher activation for non self-serving attributions in non-depressed participants and for self-serving attributions in depressed patients, and reduced coupling of the dorsomedial prefrontal cortex seed region and the limbic areas when depressed patients made self-serving attributions.

== Evidence against ==
When asked to rate both their performance and the performance of others, non-depressed individuals demonstrated positive bias when rating themselves but no bias when rating others. Depressed individuals conversely showed no bias when rating themselves but a positive bias when rating others.

When assessing participant thoughts in public versus private settings, the thoughts of non-depressed individuals were more optimistic in public than private, while depressed individuals were less optimistic in public.

When asked to rate their performance immediately after a task and after some time had passed, depressed individuals were more accurate when they rated themselves immediately after the task but were more negative after time had passed whereas non-depressed individuals were positive immediately after and some time after.

Although depressed individuals make accurate judgments about having no control in situations where they in fact have no control, this appraisal also carries over to situations where they do have control, suggesting that the depressed perspective is not more accurate overall.

One study suggested that in real-world settings, depressed individuals are actually less accurate and more overconfident in their predictions than their non-depressed peers. Participants' attributional accuracy may also be more related to their overall attributional style rather than the presence and severity of their depressive symptoms.

== Criticism of the evidence ==
Some have argued that the evidence is not more conclusive because no standard for reality exists, the diagnoses are dubious, and the results may not apply to the real world. Because many studies rely on self-report of depressive symptoms and self-reports are known to be biased, the diagnosis of depression in these studies may not be valid, necessitating the use of other objective measures. Due to most of these studies using designs that do not necessarily approximate real-world phenomena, the external validity of the depressive realism hypothesis is unclear. There is also concern that the depressive realism effect is merely a byproduct of the depressed person being in a situation that agrees with their negative bias.

== See also ==
- Defensive pessimism – Cognitive strategy for preparation
- Depression – State of low mood and aversion to activity
- Dunning–Kruger effect – Cognitive bias about one's own skill
- Dysthymia – Psychiatric disorder defined by chronic depression
- List of cognitive biases
- Major depressive disorder – Mood disorder
- Perspective – Concept of personal perspective in philosophy
- Philosophical pessimism – View that life and existence are of negative value
- Positivity offset – Cognitive bias
- Self-serving bias – Distortion to enhance self-esteem, or to see oneself overly favorably
