= Patricia Devine =

American academic

Patricia Grace Devine is a professor of psychology at the University of Wisconsin–Madison, where she was the psychology department chair from 2009 to 2014. She was also the 2012 president of the Society for Personality and Social Psychology.

She is an experimental social psychologist who specializes in prejudice, stereotypes, and intergroup relations. She received her PhD in social psychology from Ohio State University in 1986.

== Major contributions ==
Devine's 1989 paper, Stereotypes and prejudice: Their automatic and controlled components, received the prestigious Scientific Impact Award from the Society of Experimental Social Psychology, recognizing her paper's lasting impact that fundamentally altered the landscape of prejudice and stereotyping research. Her paper demonstrated that stereotypes and prejudicial emotions can be activated automatically, in opposition to one's explicit, controlled beliefs. This insight has spurred four decades of research on the automaticity and control of prejudice.

In 2006, she, Austin, Forscher, and Cox developed an intervention that taught participants cognitive techniques to overcome unintentional race bias, which was able to reduce implicit bias up to two months after the intervention. Since that initial publication in 2012, the bias habit-breaking training intervention has been tested in over a dozen randomized controlled trials and shown to be effective and generalizable to different forms of bias.

== Selected Publications ==
- The Role of Discrepancy-Associated Affect in Prejudice Reduction Co-Author: Margo J. Monteith
- Intuitive versus Rational Judgment and the Role of Stereotyping in the Human Condition: Kirk or Spock? Co-Author: Steven J. Sherman
- Stereotypes and Prejudice: Their Automatic and Controlled Components
- Overattribution Effect: The Role of Confidence and Attributional Complexity
- Prejudice and Outgroup Perception
- Getting Hooked on Research in Social Psychology: Examples from Eyewitness Identification and Prejudice
- Diagnostic and Confirmation Strategies in Trait Hypothesis Testing Co-Authors: Edward R. Hirt and Elizabeth M. Gehrke
- Prejudice With and Without Compunction Co-Authors: Margo J. Monteith, Julia R. Zuwerink and Andre J. Elliot
- Goals in Social Information Processing: The Case of Anticipated Interaction Co-Authors: Constantine Sedikides and Robert W. Fuhrman

=== Recent publications ===
William T. L. Cox, Lyn Abramson, Devine, and Steven Hollon, proposed the integrated perspective on prejudice and depression, which unites cognitive theories of depression with theories of prejudice, casting them in a common terminology and identifying ways that depression research can inform prejudice research and vice versa. This model has been used to adapt evidence-based clinical psychology methodologies, like cognitive behavioral therapy to enhance Devine and colleagues' bias intervention work with the bias habit-breaking training.

Devine, along with William T. L. Cox, Alyssa Bischmann, and Janet Hyde at the University of Wisconsin-Madison, have suggested that “gaydar” is an alternate label for using stereotypes to infer orientation (e.g., inferring that fashionable men are gay) (2015). These studies have revealed that orientation is not visible from the face—participants did, however, readily infer orientation from stereotypic attributes (e.g., fashion, career). Compared to a control group, people stereotyped more when led to believe in gaydar, whereas people stereotyped less when told gaydar is an alternate label for stereotyping. It was concluded that “gaydar” serves as a legitimizing myth that disguises and perpetuates stereotyping.
