= Lauren Alloy =

American professor of psychology (born 1953)

Lauren B. Alloy
- Born: November 22, 1953 (age 72)
- Education: University of Pennsylvania
- Occupation: Psychologist
- Employer: Temple University

Lauren B. Alloy (born Lauren Helene Bersh; November 22, 1953) is an American psychologist, recognized for her research on mood disorders. Along with colleagues Lyn Abramson and Gerald Metalsky, she developed the hopelessness theory of depression. With Abramson, she also developed the depressive realism hypothesis. Alloy is a professor of psychology at Temple University in Philadelphia, Pennsylvania.

== Early life and education ==
Alloy was born in Philadelphia in 1953. She earned her B.A. in Psychology in 1974 and her Ph.D. in experimental and clinical psychology in 1979, both from the University of Pennsylvania. Her graduate school mentors were psychologists Martin Seligman and Richard Solomon.

== Professional career ==
Alloy was a faculty member at Northwestern University from 1979 to 1989. She has been a professor of psychology in the Department of Psychology and Neuroscience at Temple University since 1989 and is the principal investigator of the Mood and Cognition Lab. Her research focuses on cognitive, interpersonal, and biopsychosocial processes in the onset and maintenance of depression and bipolar disorder. She is the author of over 350 scholarly publications and is in the top 1% of most cited authors in psychology.

In the late 1970s, Alloy and her longtime collaborator Abramson demonstrated that depressed individuals held a more accurate view than their non-depressed counterparts in a test which measured the illusion of control. This finding, termed "depressive realism", held true even when the depression was manipulated experimentally.With Abramson and their colleague, Gerald Metalsky, Alloy introduced the "hopelessness theory of depression" (see also Behavioral theories of depression). Her recent work employs prospective, longitudinal designs to investigate risk for depressive and bipolar disorders in adolescence in collaboration with Dr. Robin Nusslock at Northwestern University.

== Selected awards ==
- 2014 - Association for Behavioral and Cognitive Therapies Lifetime Achievement Award (jointly with Lyn Abramson)
- 2014 - Society for Research in Psychopathology Joseph Zubin Award
- 2009 - Association for Psychological Science James McKeen Cattell Award for Lifetime Achievement in Applied Psychological Research (jointly with Lyn Abramson)
- 2003 - Society for a Science of Clinical Psychology Distinguished Scientist Award (jointly with Lyn Abramson)
- 2002 - American Psychological Association Master Lecturer Award in Psychopathology (jointly with Lyn Abramson)
- 1984 - American Psychological Association Young Psychologist Award

== Selected works ==
- Alloy, L.B., & Abramson, L.Y. (2007). Depressive realism. In R. Baumeister & K. Vohs (Eds.), Encyclopedia of Social Psychology (pp. 242–243). New York: Sage Publications.
- Alloy, L. B., Kelly, K. A., Mineka, S., & Clements, C. M. (1990). Comorbidity of anxiety and depressive disorders: a helplessness-hopelessness perspective.
- Abramson, L. Y., Metalsky, G. I., & Alloy, L. B. (1989). Hopelessness depression: A theory-based subtype of depression. Psychological review, 96(2), 358.
- Alloy, L.B., & Abramson, L.Y. (1988). Depressive realism: Four theoretical perspectives. In L.B. Alloy (Ed.), Cognitive processes in depression. New York: Guilford.
- Alloy, L. B., & Tabachnik, N. (1984). Assessment of covariation by humans and animals: the joint influence of prior expectations and current situational information. Psychological review, 91(1), 112.
- Alloy, L. B., & Abramson, L. Y. (1979). Judgment of contingency in depressed and nondepressed students: Sadder but wiser?. Journal of experimental psychology: General, 108(4), 441.
