= William T. L. Cox =

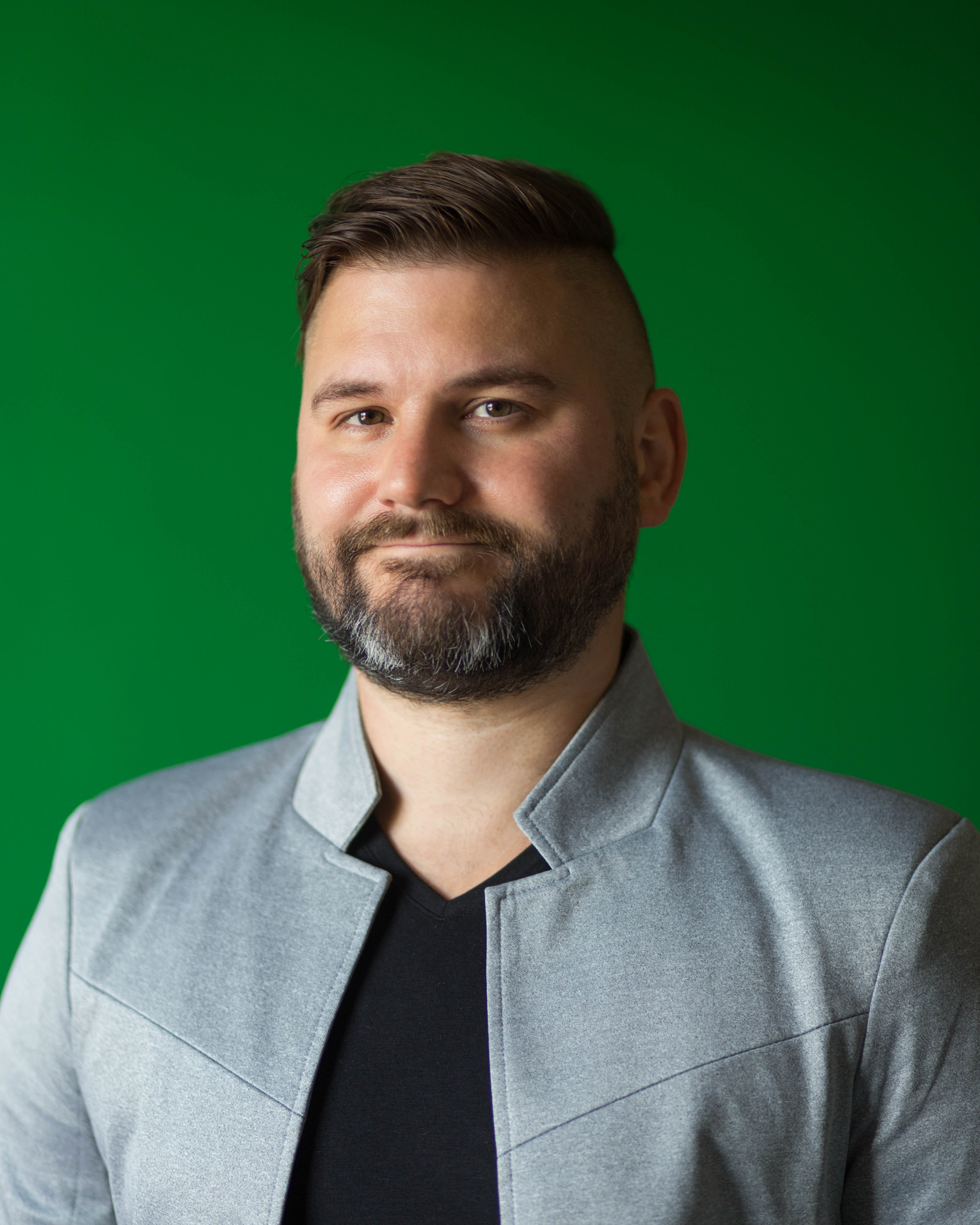
- Born: November 14, 1984 (age 41)
- Education: University of Florida (B.S. in psychology); University of Wisconsin-Madison (M.S. in psychology); University of Wisconsin-Madison (Ph.D.)
- Known for: Evidence-based diversity interventions Implicit bias
- Notable work: Overcoming Bias Habits; Diverse Joy
- Title: Scientist-Practitioner
- Awards: Maximizing Investigator's Research Award (NIGMS, 2018-2023); Named one of Madison, WI's "Forty Under 40" (In Business Magazine, 2024)
- Scientific career
- Fields: Psychology, Behavioral Science
- Workplaces: Inequity Agents of Change (Founder/CEO; 2021-Present) University of Wisconsin-Madison (Center for Demography, Health, and Aging, Affiliate Scientist-Practitioner, 2023-Present; Department of Psychology, Scientist, 2016-2023; PhD Student, 2007-2015)
- Website: biashabit.com

Dr. William Taylor Laimaka Cox (born 14 November 1984) is a scientist-practitioner in the United States who studies and implements evidence-based methods to reduce cognitive and behavioral biases and promote inclusion and equity, most especially the bias habit-breaking training, which has been experimentally shown to be highly effective at creating lasting, meaningful changes related to bias and diversity. He is the author of Overcoming Bias Habits, a peer-reviewed popular press book from University of California Press that translates the bias habit-breaking training for broad audiences.

Dr. Cox is the Founder/CEO of Inequity Agents of Change, a 501(c)(3) nonprofit dedicated to widespread dissemination of evidence-based methods to create lasting, meaningful change related to diversity and inclusion. They provide training and resources to individuals and organizations around the world, harnessing the science of cognitive-behavioral change to empower people as agents of change to reduce bias, create inclusion, and promote equity. He is also one of two co-hosts of Diverse Joy, a podcast devoted to "infusing science, practical skills, and most of all, joy, into discussions about diversity." Diverse Joy is ranked in the top 5% of all podcasts globally.

== Early life ==
Cox was born in Frankfurt, Germany on 14 November, 1984, where his father was serving in the U.S. Army. He is the adopted son of Terry Keith Cox and Valen Kamaokalani Auna Cox, and has three brothers and one sister. His background is White American and Native Hawaiian. He grew up moving around the world, never living in any one location longer than two years until college.

== Career ==
Cox completed his PhD in social psychology in 2015 at the University of Wisconsin - Madison. He has published scientific research on fundamental processes at play in stereotyping and bias, especially how neural, cognitive, and cultural processes lead to the perpetuation of stereotypes and biases.

With depression researcher Abramson, his former PhD adviser, Devine, and cognitive behavioral therapy researcher Hollon, Cox developed a model connecting evidence-based methods of cognitive-behavioral change used in clinical psychology to problems related to stereotyping, bias, and prejudice — topics typically studied in social psychology. Cox and his colleagues argued that methods like cognitive behavioral therapy, mindfulness, and acceptance and commitment therapy were likely candidates for effectively reducing cognitive biases related to race, gender, LGBTQ+, disability, and other historically marginalized groups.

He has conducted research on the cognitive structure of stereotypes, demonstrating that some stereotypes primarily serve as categorization cues, especially those stereotypes related to social groups with non-visible defining features, like gay men. Whereas other researchers have argued that people have an accurate "gaydar" ability that enables people to visually identify whether someone is gay or straight, Cox and his colleagues argued that "gaydar" is simply an alternate label for using stereotypes to infer orientation (e.g., inferring that fashionable men are gay), and thereby serves the function of a legitimizing myth to reduce the normative stigma associated with stereotyping. The researchers point out that past work arguing that people have accurate "gaydar" falls prey to the false positive paradox (see also the base rate fallacy), because the alleged accuracy discounts the very low base rate of LGB people in real populations, resulting in a scenario where the "accuracy" of gaydar reported in lab studies translates to high levels of inaccuracy in the real world.

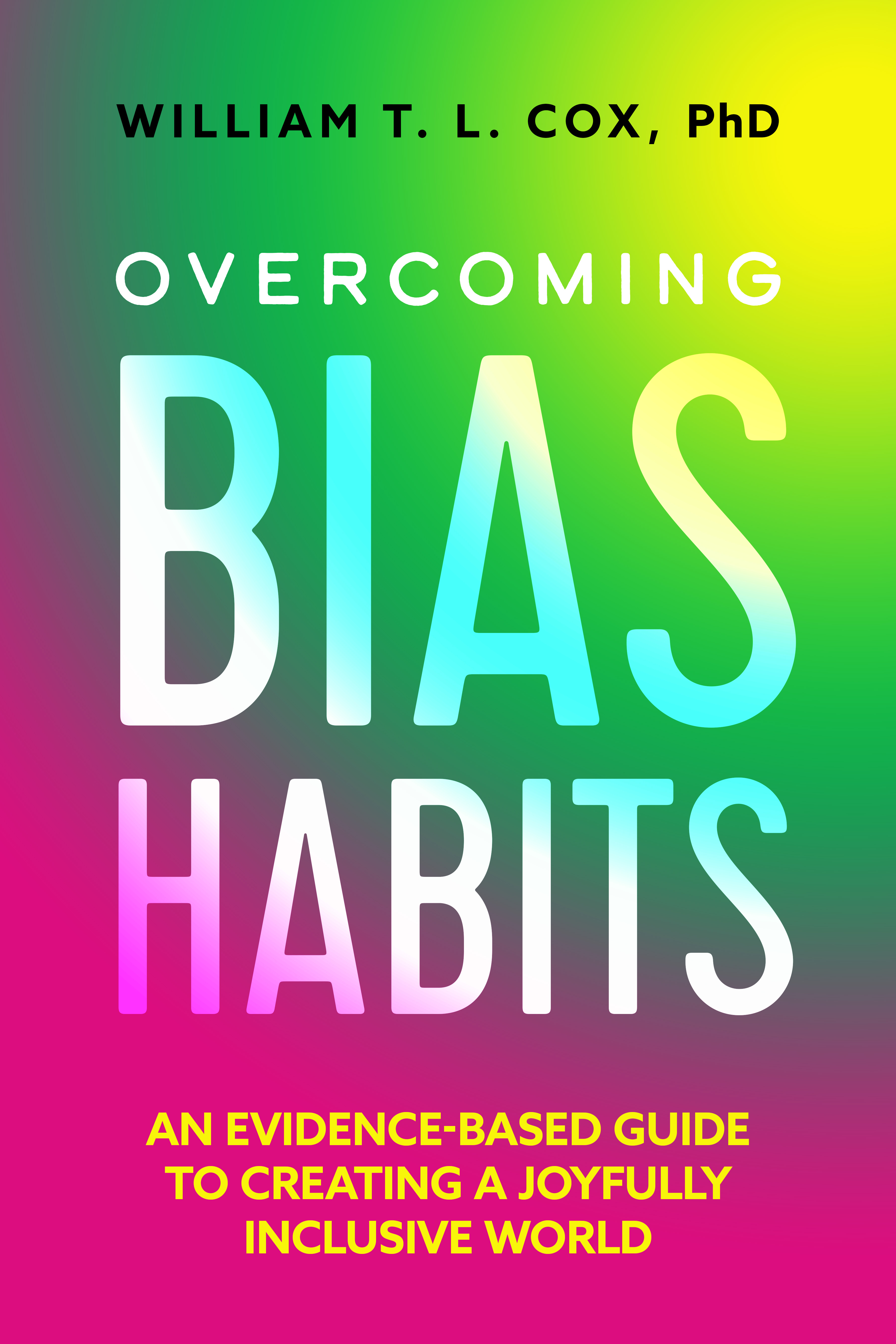

Cox focuses his work especially on translation to application, leveraging advances in basic knowledge about stereotype perpetuation to develop, test, and refine evidence-based interventions. He is perhaps best known for his work with the bias habit-breaking training, an evidence-based diversity intervention. He translated this intervention into a book, Overcoming Bias Habits: An Evidence-Based Guide to Creating a Joyfully Inclusive World, summarizing the twenty years of research and practice for a general audience.

His scientific research with the bias habit-breaking training was recognized by National Institute of General Medical Sciences at NIH in the form of the prestigious Maximizing Investigators' Research Award. In Business magazine named Dr. Cox one of Madison, WI’s “Forty Under 40” Class of 2024. He and his work have been featured several times on NPR and WPR, and has appeared in The New York Times, The Washington Post, CNN, The Atlantic, Inside Higher Ed, and other major outlets.
