= Judy Garber =

Psychologist

- Occupations: Professor of Psychology and Human Development
- Awards: Boyd R. McCandless Young Scientist Award (1992), David Shakow Young Investigator Award (1995) SSCP Distinguished Scientist Award (2019)

Academic background
- Education: State University of New York at Buffalo, University of Minnesota

Judy Garber is a clinical psychologist known for her research on emotional dysregulation and mood disorders, with a focus on cognitive-behavioral interventions for adolescents who have depression. Garber is Cornelius Vanderbilt Professor of Psychology and Human Development at Vanderbilt University.

In 1992, Judy Garber received the Boyd McCandless Award from American Psychological Association (APA), Division of Developmental Psychology, for her early research achievements. In 1995, she received the APA David Shakow Young Investigator Award for distinguished contributions to clinical psychology. In 2019, Judy Garber was the recipient of the Distinguished Scientist Award by the Society for the Science of Clinical Psychology.

Garber is co-editor, with Kenneth A. Dodge, of the 1991 volume The Development of Emotion Regulation and Dysregulation, which explores how children learn to cope with both positive and negative feelings and regulate emotions. She previously co-edited the volume Human Helplessness: Theory and Applications, with Martin Seligman.

== Biography ==
Garber completed her undergraduate degree in psychology and sociology at the State University of New York at Buffalo in 1973, where she graduated summa cum laude. She continued her education at the University of Minnesota, earning her Ph.D. in clinical psychology in 1987. Garber obtained her license as a clinical psychologist from the State of Tennessee in 1988. She has been a member of the faculty at Vanderbilt University since 1985.

From 1988 to 1993, Garber was a faculty scholar supported by the William T. Grant Foundation. Her research has been supported by an Independent Scientist Career Development Award from the National Institutes of Health (2003-2008) and by grants from the National Institute of Mental Health.

Garber served as associate editor of the Journal of Abnormal Child Psychology (2002–2005) and Prevention & Treatment (2002–2003).

== Research ==
Garber's research examines the etiology, maintenance, prevention, and treatment of mood disorders in children and adolescents. She has studied depression among adolescents and children, the impact of depression on family functioning, and gender differences in depression. In a widely cited study, Garber, along with Nancy S. Robinson and David Valentiner, examined relations between parenting behaviors of mothers with a range of psychopathology (77% with prior history of a mood disorder) and their children's depressive symptoms. The study established maternal acceptance as a protective factor mitigating risk of children's depression, whereas maternal psychological control increased risk of children's depression.

Another one of her studies focused on comorbidity of depression with anxiety and substance use disorders in adolescents. In this longitudinal study, Garber evaluated a group of adolescents annually from 6th to 12th grade; the majority of participants in the study had mothers with a history of depression. The study found different patterns of comorbid risk factors in boys and girls: For boys, a prior history of anxiety disorders increased risk of depression; for girls a prior history of substance use increased risk of depression.

In a synthesis of research on preventing symptoms of depression in adolescents, Garber and her colleague Jason Horowitz found that the most effective programs were more accurately described as treatment rather than prevention efforts. Garber has been involved in conducting a clinical trial to evaluate the efficacy of a Family Depression Prevention (FDP) program aimed at decreasing the occurrence of depression in children whose parents are depressed through integrated family intervention. Children born to parents with depression have an increased risk for depression and anxiety; hence the FDP hopes to decrease onsets of depressive episodes and lower levels of anxious and depressive symptoms in children and their parents.

In research with Janice Zeman, Garber studied factors that influence display rules for controlling or expressing anger, sadness, and pain. They specifically studied how children (first, third, and fifth graders) regulate their emotions based on who is watching, the type of emotion, and their gender. Their main finding was that children were more likely to suppress their displays of emotion when they were with peers in comparison to when they were with their parents or alone.

Her current research focuses on understanding and preventing depression in children of depressed parents. It evaluates strategies aimed at supporting families in managing health, mental well-being, and social development challenges. The research also examines skills for cognitive therapy and explores how parental mental processing relates to depression in children.

== Representative publications ==
- Garber, J.; Bradshaw, C. (2020). "Developmental psychopathology and the Research Domain Criteria: Friend or foe?". Journal of Clinical Child & Adolescent Psychology. 49 (3): 1–12. doi:10.1080/15374416.2020.1753205. PMC 8972141. PMID 33950761.
- Garber, J.; Brunwasser, S.; Zerr, A.A.; Schwartz, K.T.G.; Sova, K.; Weersing, V.R. (2016). "Treatment and prevention of depression and anxiety in youth: Test of cross-over effects". Depression and Anxiety. 33 (10): 939–959. doi:10.1002/da.22519. PMC 5094283. PMID 27699941.
- Garber, J.; Frankel, S.A.; Herrington, C.G. (2016). "Developmental demands of cognitive behavioral therapy for depression in children and adolescents: Cognitive, social, and emotional processes". Annual Review of Clinical Psychology. 12: 181–216. doi:10.1146/annurev-clinpsy-032814-112836. PMC 5441981. PMID 27019397.
- Kouros, C.D.; Garber, J. (2014). "Trajectories of individual depressive symptoms in adolescents: Gender and family relationships as predictors". Developmental Psychology. 50 (12): 2633–2643. doi:10.1037/a0038190. PMC 4591045. PMID 25329553.
- Garber, J.; Clarke, G. N.; Weersing, V. R.; Beardslee, W. R.; Brent, D. A.; Gladstone, T. R.; Shamseddeen, W. (2009). "Prevention of depression in at-risk adolescents: a randomized controlled trial". JAMA. 301 (21): 2215–2224. doi:10.1001/jama.2009.788. PMC 2737625. PMID 19491183.
- Garber, J (2006). "Depression in children and adolescents: linking risk research and prevention". American Journal of Preventive Medicine. 31 (6): 104–125. doi:10.1016/j.amepre.2006.07.007. PMID 17175406.
- Horowitz, J. L.; Garber, J. (2006). "The prevention of depressive symptoms in children and adolescents: A meta-analytic review". Journal of Consulting and Clinical Psychology. 74 (3): 401–415. doi:10.1037/0022-006X.74.3.401. PMID 16822098.
