= Lyn Yvonne Abramson =

American clinical psychologist

- Born: February 7, 1950 (age 76); Benson, Minnesota, United States
- Education: University of Pennsylvania
- Awards: James McKeen Cattell Fellow Award
- Scientific career
- Fields: Clinical Psychology
- Workplaces: University of Wisconsin–Madison

Lyn Yvonne Abramson (born February 7, 1950) is Professor Emerita of psychology at the University of Wisconsin–Madison. She is known for her work on the learned helplessness and hopelessness in depression, depressive realism, gender differences in depression, and the behavioral approach system (BAS)/reward system hypersensitivity theory of bipolar disorder.

Along with her frequent collaborator Lauren Alloy, Abramson was awarded the James McKeen Cattell Fellow Award for 2008–2009 by the Association for Psychological Science. In 2025, Abramson and Alloy were awarded the American Psychological Foundation Gold Medal Award for Impact in Psychology.

Abramson is on the Institute for Scientific Information list of highly cited researchers.

== Biography ==
Abramson was born in Benson, Minnesota. She took her undergraduate degree at the University of Wisconsin–Madison in 1972. She subsequently completed her Ph.D. in clinical psychology at University of Pennsylvania in 1978, where she studied learned helplessness under the supervision of Martin Seligman.In one of her early papers with Seligman titled "Learned Helplessness in Humans: Critique and Reformulation", Abramson proposed a link between a particular explanatory style and depression.

As a clinical psychologist, her main areas of research interest have been exploring vulnerability to major depressive disorder and psychobiological and cognitive approaches to depression, bipolar disorder, and eating disorders.

With her co-authors William T. L. Cox, Patricia Devine, and Steven D. Hollon, she proposed the integrated perspective on prejudice and depression, which combines cognitive theories of depression with cognitive theories of prejudice. Abramson and her coauthors propose that many cases of depression may be caused by prejudice from the self or from another person. "This depression caused by prejudice – which the researchers call deprejudice — can occur at many levels. In the classic case, prejudice causes depression at the societal level (e.g., Nazis’ prejudice causing Jews’ depression), but this causal chain can also occur at the interpersonal level (e.g., an abuser's prejudice causing an abusee's depression), or even at the intrapersonal level, within a single person (e.g., a man's prejudice against himself causing his depression)." This work has served as a bridge to adapt clinical psychology methodologies like cognitive behavior therapy for use in combatting prejudice and bias, as Cox and Devine have done in their bias habit-breaking training.

== Books ==
Abramson, L. Y., Editor (1988). Social cognition and clinical psychology: A synthesis. Guilford.

== Representative publications ==
- Abramson, L. Y., Metalsky, G. I., & Alloy, L. B. (1989). Hopelessness depression: A theory-based subtype of depression. Psychological Review, 96(2), 358–372. https://doi.org/10.1037/0033-295X.96.2.358
- Abramson, L. Y., Seligman, M. E., & Teasdale, J. D. (1978). Learned helplessness in humans: Critique and reformulation. Journal of Abnormal Psychology, 87(1), 49–74. https://doi.org/10.1037/0021-843X.87.1.49
- Abramson, L.Y., Alloy, L.B., Hankin, B.L., Haeffel, G.J., MacCoon, D.G., & Gibb, B.E. (2002). Cognitive vulnerability-stress models of depression in a self-regulatory and psychobiological context. In I.H. Gotlib & C.L. Hammen (Eds.), Handbook of Depression, (pp.268-294). New York: Guilford.
- Alloy, L. B., & Abramson, L. Y. (1979). Judgment of contingency in depressed and nondepressed students: Sadder but wiser? Journal of Experimental Psychology: General, 108(4), 441–485. https://doi.org/10.1037/0096-3445.108.4.441
- Alloy, L. B., & Abramson, L. Y. (1988). Depressive realism: Four theoretical perspectives. In L. B. Alloy (Ed.), Cognitive processes in depression (pp. 223–265). The Guilford Press.

== See also ==
- Depressive realism
