= Gaydar =

Colloquialism for intuitively assessing people's sexual orientation

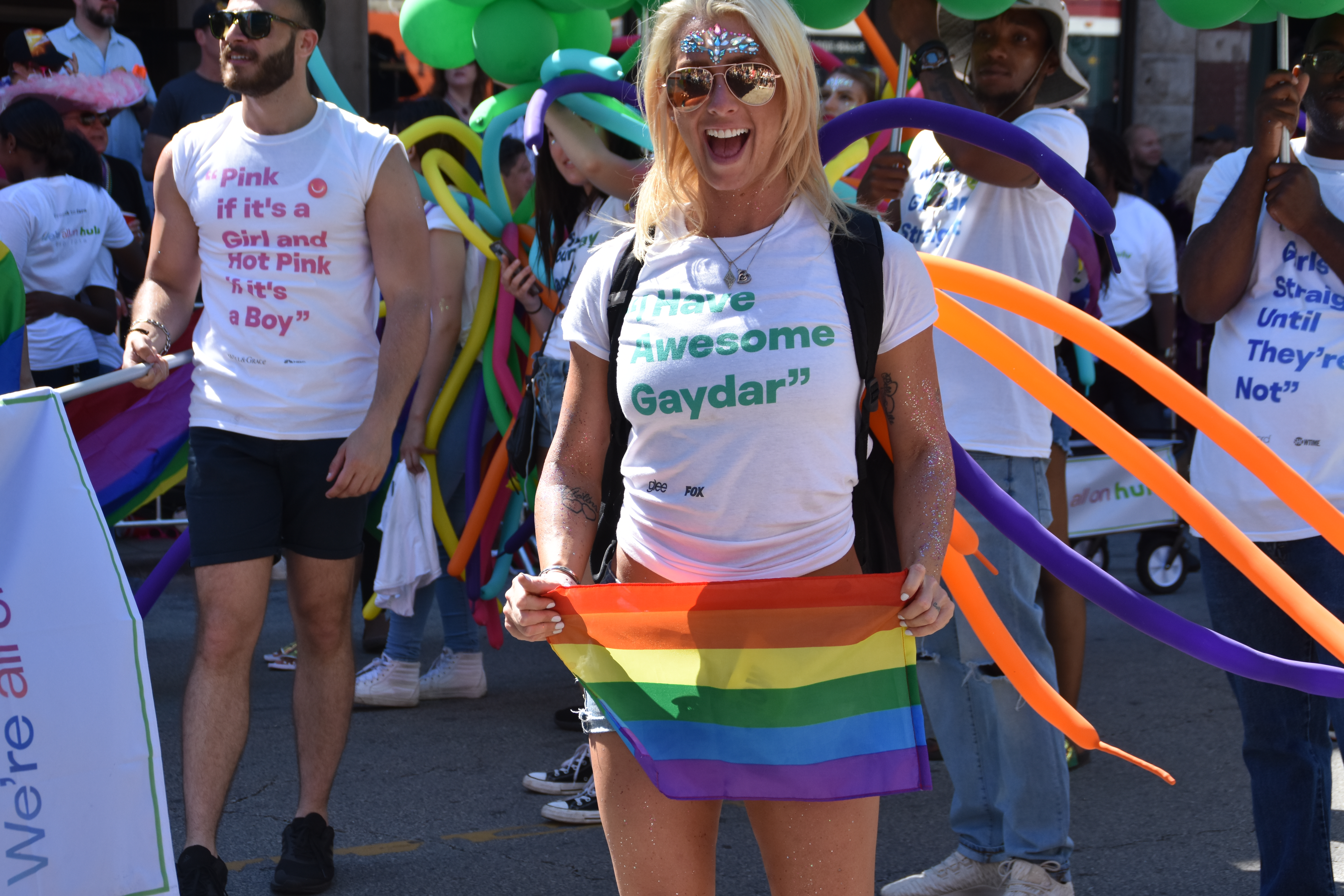
2018 pride parade attendee, wearing a shirt reading "I Have Awesome Gaydar."

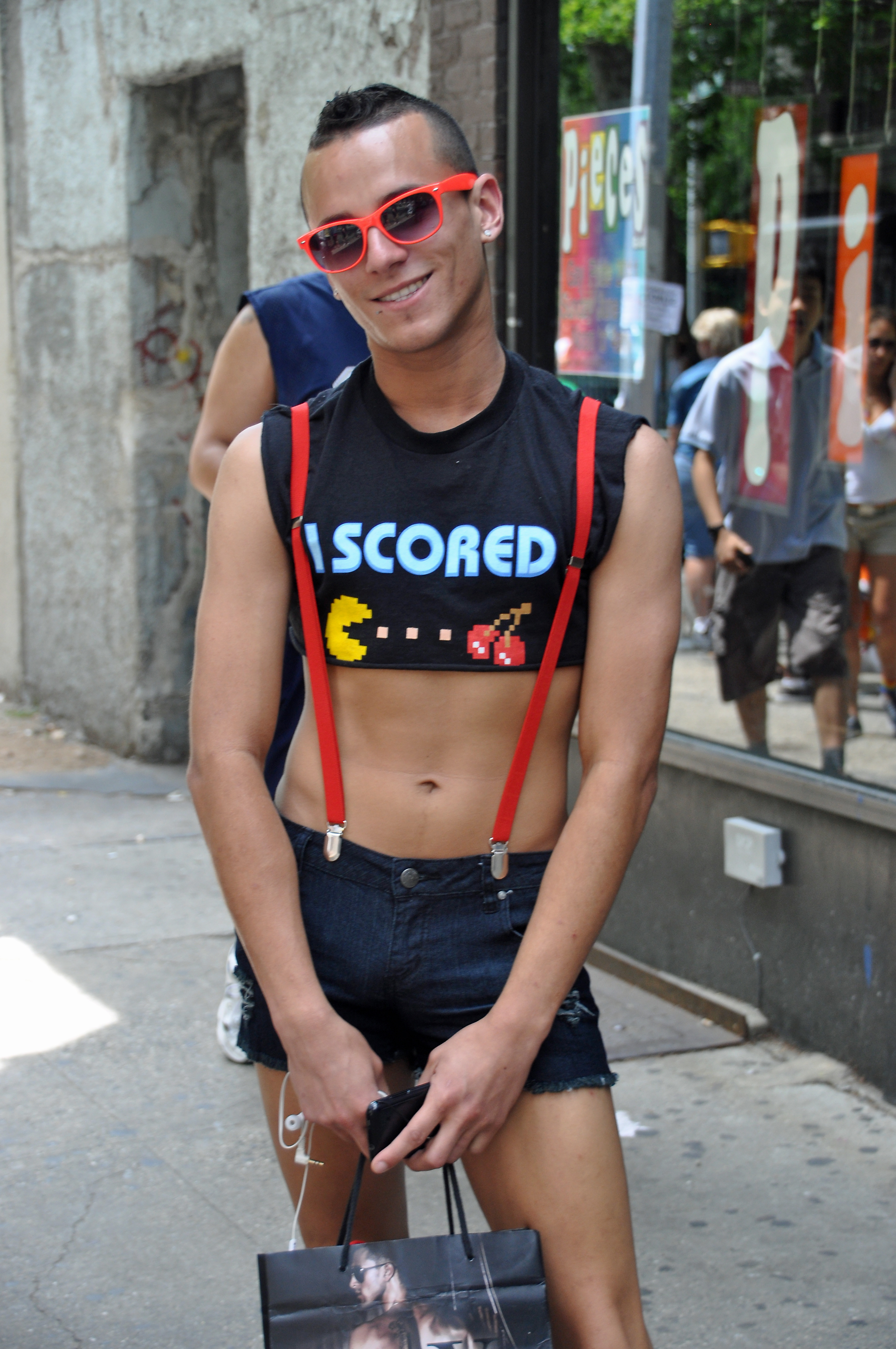
A 2011 attendee of NYC Pride, dressed in fashion that may indicate connection to the queer community

Gaydar (a portmanteau of gay and radar) is a colloquialism referring to the intuitive ability of a person, especially a queer person, to assess others' sexual orientations as homosexual, bisexual or straight. Gaydar relies on verbal and nonverbal clues and LGBT stereotypes, including a sensitivity to social behaviors and mannerisms like body language, the tone of voice used by a person when speaking, overt rejections of traditional gender roles, a person's occupation, and grooming habits. Similarly, transdar (a term in use since at least 1996) refers to the ability for trans people to recognize trans people who pass well, by subtle cues such as "the size of the hands and wrists".

The assumption of sexual orientation by outward appearance or behavior has been challenged by situations in which masculine gay men do not act in a stereotypically gay fashion, or in which metrosexual men (regardless of sexuality) exhibit a lifestyle, spending habits, and concern for personal appearance stereotypical of fashionable urban gay men. For women, a tomboy might be mistaken for being butch, or a lesbian might act and appear in traditionally feminine ways.

Since at least 2015, media outlets such as Australia's ABC News have called the gaydar "damaging" and possibly "dangerous" due to its perpetuation of harmful stereotypes, its potential to lead to harassment, and its potential to dissuade people from coming out of the closet on their own terms. Gayety argues that the only way to assess a person's sexuality is based on their open identification and whom they are dating.

== Scientific research ==
In 1987, a Journal of Homosexuality study asked people to judge sexual orientation from video clips, with results concluding that it was a myth. A 1999 study in the Journal of Personality and Social Psychology showed that people could judge sexual orientation more accurately than chance. This study asked people to indicate their sexual orientation using the Kinsey scale and then had others view very brief silent clips of the people talking using thin-slicing. The viewers rated their sexual orientations on the same scale and the researchers found a significant correlation between where the people said they were on the scale and where they were perceived to be on the scale. Studies in 2008 and 2010 have repeated this finding and have even shown that home videos of children can be used to judge accurately their sexual orientation later in life.

Later studies found that gaydar was also accurate at rates greater than chance for judgments just from the face. Study participants use gendered facial cues and stereotypes of gay people to make their judgments, but reliably misjudge sexual orientation for people countering stereotypes. The ethnicity and nationality of both the judge and the person being judged appear irrelevant when making judgments from faces. Even individual facial features (just the eyes) can sometimes give enough information to tell whether a man or woman is gay, straight, or lesbian. One study showed that views of men's and women's faces lasting for about 1/25 of a second were sufficient to tell whether they were gay, straight, or lesbian. People's judgments were no more accurate when they had more time to make their judgments. Follow-up work to this suggested that gaydar happens automatically when someone sees another person and that seeing someone's face automatically activates stereotypes about gays and straights. People seem not to know that they have gaydar, though. Gay men have more accurate gaydar than straight men, and women have more accurate gaydar when they are ovulating. One study hypothesized that this might be because homosexual people are more attentive to detail than heterosexual people are, apparently as an adopted perceptual style aiding in the recognition of other homosexual people. Other studies have found that men and women with body shapes and walking styles similar to people of the opposite sex are more often perceived as gay.

A study by UCLA assistant professor Kerri Johnson found that observers were able to accurately guess the sexual orientation of men 60 percent of the time, slightly better than would be achieved by random chance; with women, their guesses didn't exceed chance. Gender-specific body movements are not reliably associated with a person's sexual orientation; this is true of face shape, but surprisingly not for voices, even though people think they are associated with a person's sexual orientation. A handful of studies have investigated the question of gaydar from the voice. They have found that people can tell who is gay and straight from their voices, but have mostly focused on men (sometimes terming the vocal difference "gay lisp"). Detailed acoustic analyses have highlighted a number of factors in a person's voice that are used, one of which is the way that gay and straight men pronounce "s" sounds. Acoustic cues have also been shown to contribute to perception of homosexuality in other languages, including Mandarin (for men), as well as Spanish (for men and women).

Research by William T. L. Cox and his colleagues proposed that "gaydar" is simply an alternate label for using LGBT stereotypes to infer orientation (e.g., inferring that fashionable men are gay). This work points out that the scientific work reviewed above that claims to demonstrate accurate gaydar falls prey to the false positive paradox (see also the base rate fallacy), because the alleged accuracy discounts the very low base rate of LGBT people in real populations, resulting in a scenario where the "accuracy" reported above in lab studies translates to high levels of inaccuracy in the real world. Cox writes, "Most people think of stereotyping as inappropriate. But if you're not calling it 'stereotyping', if you're giving it this other label and camouflaging it as 'gaydar,' it appears to be more socially and personally acceptable."

In the research by Chadly Stern done at NYU about the relationship of "gaydar" and political orientation, the team found out that conservatives possess mostly better "gaydar" than liberals do. Though the accuracy of "gaydar" in conservatives depend on the "validity of the cues" more, Stern writes, overall, conservatives performed better in determining the sexual orientation in their research. The real-world connection of the finding is weaker because the correlation between facial features (which their research used for the basis of participants' "gaydar") and sexual orientation. By using cognitive load manipulation, the team also found that both liberals and conservatives used gender stereotypes to determine the sexual orientation during the research. This finding further the idea that "gaydar" is an alternate label to for using stereotypes in a more socially acceptable way.

== Electronic device ==
In the early 2000s, an electronic device based on the Japanese Lovegety wireless dating device was marketed as 'Gaydar' and reported on widely in the media. This was a keychain-sized device that would send out a wireless signal, alerting the user via a vibration, beep, or flash when a similar device was within 12 m (40 ft). This lets the user know that a like-minded person was nearby.

== Artificial intelligence ==
Stanford University researchers Michal Kosinski and Yilun Wang carried out a study in 2017 which claimed that a facial recognition algorithm using neural networks could identify sexual orientation in 81% of the tested cases for men and 74% with women by reviewing photos of online dating profiles. Kosinski voiced concern about privacy and the potential for misuse of AI, and suggested that his findings were consistent with the prenatal hormone theory of sexual orientation, which hypothesizes that levels of androgens exposure in the womb help determine whether a person is straight, bisexual or gay. PHT predicts that gay and straight individuals may choose to present themselves differently on their profile pictures or have different facial appearance. Two replication studies confirmed the main findings of this study. It also found that even when faces are blurred it is possible to classify sexual orientation. A blog post by AI researcher Blaise Agüera y Arcas criticized the study for using photos from an uncontrolled environment. Rather than picking up on the facial structure, it was likely the algorithm was identifying factors in grooming, lifestyle, and photo angle; a small set of questions about differences including makeup use, facial hair, and eyeglass use was nearly as accurate as of the original study.

== See also ==
- Biometrics
- Biology and sexual orientation (physical differences)
- Fruit machine (homosexuality test)
- Linguistic profiling § Gender and sexual orientation
- Straight-acting
