= Locus of control =

Concept in psychology

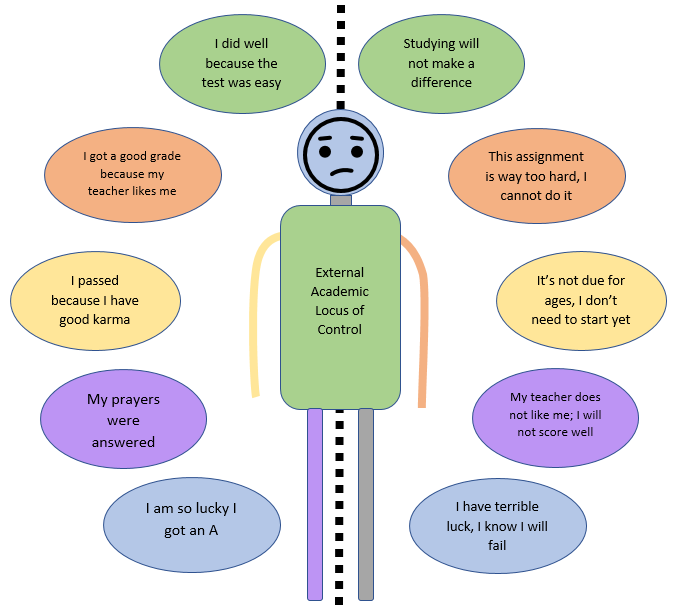
A person with an external locus of control attributes academic success or failure to luck or chance, a higher power or the influence of another person, rather than their own actions. They also struggle more with procrastination and difficult tasks.

Locus of control is the degree to which people believe that they, as opposed to external forces (beyond their influence), have control over the outcome of events in their lives. The concept was developed by Julian B. Rotter in 1954, and has since become an aspect of personality psychology. A person's "locus" (plural "loci", Latin for "place" or "location") is conceptualized as internal (a belief that one can control one's own life) or external (a belief that life is controlled by outside factors which the person can not influence, or that chance or fate controls their lives).

Individuals with a strong internal locus of control believe events in their life are primarily a result of their own actions: for example, when receiving an exam result, people with an internal locus of control tend to praise or blame themselves and their abilities. People with a strong external locus of control tend to praise or blame external factors such as the teacher or the difficulty of the exam.

Locus of control has generated much research in a variety of areas in psychology. The construct is applicable to such fields as educational psychology, health psychology, industrial and organizational psychology, and clinical psychology. Debate continues whether domain-specific or more global measures of locus of control will prove to be more useful in practical application. Careful distinctions should also be made between locus of control (a personality variable linked with generalized expectancies about the future) and attributional style (a concept concerning explanations for past outcomes), or between locus of control and concepts such as self-efficacy.

Locus of control is one of the four dimensions of core self-evaluations – one's fundamental appraisal of oneself – along with neuroticism, self-efficacy, and self-esteem. The concept of core self-evaluations was first examined by Judge, Locke, and Durham (1997), and since has proven to have the ability to predict several work outcomes, specifically, job satisfaction and job performance. In a follow-up study, Judge et al. (2002) argued that locus of control, neuroticism, self-efficacy, and self-esteem factors may have a common core.

== History ==
Weiner's attribution theory as applied to student motivation
	Perceived locus of control	
	Internal	External
Attributions of control	Ability	Hardness of tasks
Attributions of no control	Effort	Luck or fate

Locus of control as a theoretical construct derives from Julian B. Rotter's (1954) social learning theory of personality. It is an example of a problem-solving generalized expectancy, a broad strategy for addressing a wide range of situations. In 1966 he published an article in Psychological Monographs which summarized over a decade of research (by Rotter and his students), much of it previously unpublished. In 1976, Herbert M. Lefcourt defined the perceived locus of control: "...a generalised expectancy for internal as opposed to external control of reinforcements". Attempts have been made to trace the genesis of the concept to the work of Alfred Adler, but its immediate background lies in the work of Rotter and his students. Early work on the topic of expectations about control of reinforcement had been performed in the 1950s by James and Phares (prepared for unpublished doctoral dissertations supervised by Rotter at Ohio State University).

Another Rotter student, William H. James studied two types of "expectancy shifts":

- Typical expectancy shifts, believing that success (or failure) would be followed by a similar outcome
- Atypical expectancy shifts, believing that success (or failure) would be followed by a dissimilar outcome

Additional research led to the hypothesis that typical expectancy shifts were displayed more often by those who attributed their outcomes to ability, whereas those who displayed atypical expectancy were more likely to attribute their outcomes to chance. This was interpreted that people could be divided into those who attribute to ability (an internal cause) versus those who attribute to luck (an external cause). Bernard Weiner argued that rather than ability-versus-luck, locus may relate to whether attributions are made to stable or unstable causes.

Rotter (1975, 1989) has discussed problems and misconceptions in others' use of the internal-versus-external construct.

== Personality orientation ==
Rotter (1975) cautioned that internality and externality represent two ends of a continuum, not an either/or typology. Internals tend to attribute outcomes of events to their own control. People who have internal locus of control believe that the outcomes of their actions are results of their own abilities. Internals believe that their hard work would lead them to obtain positive outcomes. They also believe that every action has its consequence, which makes them accept the fact that things happen and it depends on them if they want to have control over it or not. Externals attribute outcomes of events to external circumstances. A person with an external locus of control will tend to believe that their present circumstances are not the effect of their own influence, decisions, or control, and even that their own actions are a result of external factors, such as fate, luck, history, the influence of powerful forces, or individually or unspecified others (such as governmental entities; corporations; racial, religious, ethnic, or fraternal groups; sexes; political affiliations; outgroups; or even perceived individual personal antagonists) and/or a belief that the world is too complex for one to predict or influence its outcomes. Laying blame on others for one's own circumstances with the implication one is owed a moral or other debt is an indicator of a tendency toward an external locus of control. It should not be thought, however, that internality is linked exclusively with attribution to effort and externality with attribution to luck (as Weiner's work – see below – makes clear). This has obvious implications for differences between internals and externals in terms of their achievement motivation, suggesting that internal locus is linked with higher levels of need for achievement. Due to their locating control outside themselves, externals tend to feel they have less control over their fate. People with an external locus of control tend to be more stressed and prone to clinical depression.

Internals were believed by Rotter (1966) to exhibit two essential characteristics: high achievement motivation and low outer-directedness. This was the basis of the locus-of-control scale proposed by Rotter in 1966, although it was based on Rotter's belief that locus of control is a single construct. Since 1970, Rotter's assumption of uni-dimensionality has been challenged, with Levenson (for example) arguing that different dimensions of locus of control (such as beliefs that events in one's life are self-determined, or organized by powerful others and are chance-based) must be separated. Weiner's early work in the 1970s suggested that orthogonal to the internality-externality dimension, differences should be considered between those who attribute to stable and those who attribute to unstable causes.

This new, dimensional theory meant that one could now attribute outcomes to ability (an internal stable cause), effort (an internal unstable cause), task difficulty (an external stable cause) or luck (an external, unstable cause). Although this was how Weiner originally saw these four causes, he has been challenged as to whether people see luck (for example) as an external cause, whether ability is always perceived as stable, and whether effort is always seen as changing. Indeed, in more recent publications (e.g. Weiner, 1980) he uses different terms for these four causes (such as "objective task characteristics" instead of "task difficulty" and "chance" instead of "luck"). Psychologists since Weiner have distinguished between stable and unstable effort, knowing that in some circumstances effort could be seen as a stable cause (especially given the presence of words such as "industrious" in English).

Regarding locus of control, there is another type of control that entails a mix among the internal and external types. People who have the combination of the two types of locus of control are often referred to as bi-locals. People who have bi-local characteristics are known to handle stress and cope with their diseases more efficiently by having the mixture of internal and external locus of control. People who have this mix of loci of control can take personal responsibility for their actions and the consequences thereof while remaining capable of relying upon and having faith in outside resources; these characteristics correspond to the internal and external loci of control, respectively.

== Measuring scales ==
The most widely used questionnaire to measure locus of control is the 23-item (plus six filler items), forced-choice scale of Rotter (1966). However, this is not the only questionnaire; Bialer's (1961) 23-item scale for children predates Rotter's work. Also relevant to the locus-of-control scale are the Crandall Intellectual Ascription of Responsibility Scale (Crandall, 1965) and the Nowicki-Strickland Scale (Nowicki & Strickland 1973). One of the earliest psychometric scales to assess locus of control (using a Likert-type scale, in contrast to the forced-choice alternative measure in Rotter's scale) was that devised by W. H. James for his unpublished doctoral dissertation, supervised by Rotter at Ohio State University; however, this remains unpublished.

Many measures of locus of control have appeared since Rotter's scale. These were reviewed by Furnham and Steele (1993) and include those related to health psychology, industrial and organizational psychology and those specifically for children (such as the Stanford Preschool Internal-External Scale for three- to six-year-olds). Furnham and Steele (1993) cite data suggesting that the most reliable, valid questionnaire for adults is the Duttweiler scale. For a review of the health questionnaires cited by these authors, see "Applications" below.

The Duttweiler (1984) Internal Control Index (ICI) addresses perceived problems with the Rotter scales, including their forced-choice format, susceptibility to social desirability and heterogeneity (as indicated by factor analysis). She also notes that, while other scales existed in 1984 to measure locus of control, "they appear to be subject to many of the same problems". Unlike the forced-choice format used on Rotter's scale, Duttweiler's 28-item ICI uses a Likert-type scale in which people must state whether they would rarely, occasionally, sometimes, frequently or usually behave as specified in each of 28 statements. The ICI assess variables pertinent to internal locus: cognitive processing, autonomy, resistance to social influence, self-confidence and delay of gratification. A small (133 student-subject) validation study indicated that the scale had good internal consistency reliability (a Cronbach's alpha of 0.85).

== Attributional style ==
Attributional style (or explanatory style) is a concept introduced by Lyn Yvonne Abramson, Martin Seligman and John D. Teasdale. This concept advances a stage further than Weiner, stating that in addition to the concepts of internality-externality and stability a dimension of globality-specificity is also needed. Abramson et al. believed that how people explained successes and failures in their lives related to whether they attributed these to internal or external factors, short-term or long-term factors, and factors that affected all situations.

The topic of attribution theory (introduced to psychology by Fritz Heider) has had an influence on locus of control theory, but there are important historical differences between the two models. Attribution theorists have been predominantly social psychologists, concerned with the general processes characterizing how and why people make the attributions they do, whereas locus of control theorists have been concerned with individual differences.

Significant to the history of both approaches are the contributions made by Bernard Weiner in the 1970s. Before this time, attribution theorists and locus of control theorists had been largely concerned with divisions into external and internal loci of causality. Weiner added the dimension of stability-instability (and later controllability), indicating how a cause could be perceived as having been internal to a person yet still beyond the person's control. The stability dimension added to the understanding of why people succeed or fail after such outcomes.

== Applications ==
Locus of control's best known application may have been in the area of health psychology, largely due to the work of Kenneth Wallston. Scales to measure locus of control in the health domain were reviewed by Furnham and Steele in 1993. The best-known are the Health Locus of Control Scale and the Multidimensional Health Locus of Control Scale, or MHLC. The latter scale is based on the idea (echoing Levenson's earlier work) that health may be attributed to three sources: internal factors (such as self-determination of a healthy lifestyle), powerful others (such as one's doctor) or luck (which is very dangerous as lifestyle advice will be ignored – these people are very difficult to help).

Some of the scales reviewed by Furnham and Steele (1993) relate to health in more specific domains, such as obesity (for example, Saltzer's (1982) Weight Locus of Control Scale or Stotland and Zuroff's (1990) Dieting Beliefs Scale), mental health (such as Wood and Letak's (1982) Mental Health Locus of Control Scale or the Depression Locus of Control Scale of Whiteman, Desmond and Price, 1987) and cancer (the Cancer Locus of Control Scale of Pruyn et al., 1988). In discussing applications of the concept to health psychology Furnham and Steele refer to Claire Bradley's work, linking locus of control to the management of diabetes mellitus. Empirical data on health locus of control in a number of fields was reviewed by Norman and Bennett in 1995; they note that data on whether certain health-related behaviors are related to internal health locus of control have been ambiguous. They note that some studies found that internal health locus of control is linked with increased exercise, but cite other studies which found a weak (or no) relationship between exercise behaviors (such as jogging) and internal health locus of control. A similar ambiguity is noted for data on the relationship between internal health locus of control and other health-related behaviors (such as breast self-examination, weight control and preventive-health behavior). Of particular interest are the data cited on the relationship between internal health locus of control and alcohol consumption.

Norman and Bennett note that some studies that compared alcoholics with non-alcoholics suggest alcoholism is linked to increased externality for health locus of control; however, other studies have linked alcoholism with increased internality. Similar ambiguity has been found in studies of alcohol consumption in the general, non-alcoholic population. They are more optimistic in reviewing the literature on the relationship between internal health locus of control and smoking cessation, although they also point out that there are grounds for supposing that powerful-others and internal-health loci of control may be linked with this behavior. It is thought that, rather than being caused by one or the other, that alcoholism is directly related to the strength of the locus, regardless of type, internal or external.

They argue that a stronger relationship is found when health locus of control is assessed for specific domains than when general measures are taken. Overall, studies using behavior-specific health locus scales have tended to produce more positive results. These scales have been found to be more predictive of general behavior than more general scales, such as the MHLC scale. Norman and Bennett cite several studies that used health-related locus-of-control scales in specific domains (including smoking cessation), diabetes, tablet-treated diabetes, hypertension, arthritis, cancer, and heart and lung disease.

They also argue that health locus of control is better at predicting health-related behavior if studied in conjunction with health value (the value people attach to their health), suggesting that health value is an important moderator variable in the health locus of control relationship. For example, Weiss and Larsen (1990) found an increased relationship between internal health locus of control and health when health value was assessed. Despite the importance Norman and Bennett attach to specific measures of locus of control, there are general textbooks on personality which cite studies linking internal locus of control with improved physical health, mental health and quality of life in people with diverse conditions: HIV, migraines, diabetes, kidney disease and epilepsy.

During the 1970s and 1980s, Whyte correlated locus of control with the academic success of students enrolled in higher-education courses. Students who were more internally controlled believed that hard work and focus would result in successful academic progress, and they performed better academically. Those students who were identified as more externally controlled (believing that their future depended upon luck or fate) tended to have lower academic-performance levels. Cassandra B. Whyte researched how control tendency influenced behavioral outcomes in the academic realm by examining the effects of various modes of counseling on grade improvements and the locus of control of high-risk college students.

Rotter also looked at studies regarding the correlation between gambling and either an internal or external locus of control. For internals, gambling is more reserved. When betting, they primarily focus on safe and moderate wagers. Externals, however, take more chances and, for example, bet more on a card or number that has not appeared for a certain period, under the notion that this card or number has a higher chance of occurring, a belief known as the gambler's fallacy.

=== Organizational psychology and religion ===
Other fields to which the concept has been applied include industrial and organizational psychology, sports psychology, educational psychology and the psychology of religion. Richard Kahoe has published work in the latter field, suggesting that intrinsic religious orientation correlates positively (and extrinsic religious orientation correlates negatively) with internal locus. Of relevance to both health psychology and the psychology of religion is the work of Holt, Clark, Kreuter and Rubio (2003) on a questionnaire to assess spiritual-health locus of control. The authors distinguished between an active spiritual-health locus of control (in which "God empowers the individual to take healthy actions") and a more passive spiritual-health locus of control (where health is left up to God). In industrial and organizational psychology, it has been found that internals are more likely to take positive action to change their jobs (rather than merely talk about occupational change) than externals. Locus of control relates to a wide variety of work variables, with work-specific measures relating more strongly than general measures. In Educational setting, some research has shown that students who were intrinsically motivated had processed reading material more deeply and had better academic performance than students with extrinsic motivation.

=== Consumer research ===
Locus of control has also been applied to the field of consumer research. For example, Martin, Veer and Pervan (2007) examined how the weight locus of control of women (i.e., beliefs about the control of body weight) influence how they react to female models in advertising of different body shapes. They found that women who believe they can control their weight ("internals"), respond most favorably to slim models in advertising, and this favorable response is mediated by self-referencing. In contrast, women who feel powerless about their weight ("externals"), self-reference larger-sized models, but only prefer larger-sized models when the advertisement is for a non-fattening product. For fattening products, they exhibit a similar preference for larger-sized models and slim models. The weight locus of control measure was also found to be correlated with measures for weight control beliefs and willpower.

=== Political ideology ===
Locus of control has been linked to political ideology. In the 1972 U.S. presidential election, research of college students found that those with an internal locus of control were substantially more likely to register as a Republican, while those with an external locus of control were substantially more likely to register as a Democratic. A 2011 study surveying students at Cameron University in Oklahoma found similar results, although these studies were limited in scope. Consistent with these findings, Kaye Sweetser (2014) found that Republicans significantly displayed greater internal locus of control than Democrats and Independents.

Those with an internal locus of control are more likely to be of higher socioeconomic status, and are more likely to be politically involved (e.g., following political news, joining a political organization) Those with an internal locus of control are also more likely to vote.

== Familial origins ==
The development of locus of control is associated with family style and resources, cultural stability and experiences with effort leading to reward. Many internals have grown up with families modeling typical internal beliefs; these families emphasized effort, education, responsibility and thinking, and parents typically gave their children rewards they had promised them. In contrast, externals are typically associated with lower socioeconomic status. Societies experiencing social unrest increase the expectancy of being out-of-control; therefore, people in such societies become more external.

The 1995 research of Schneewind suggests that "children in large single parent families headed by women are more likely to develop an external locus of control" Schultz and Schultz also claim that children in families where parents have been supportive and consistent in discipline develop internal locus of control. At least one study has found that children whose parents had an external locus of control are more likely to attribute their successes and failures to external causes. Findings from early studies on the familial origins of locus of control were summarized by Lefcourt: "Warmth, supportiveness and parental encouragement seem to be essential for development of an internal locus". However, causal evidence regarding how parental locus of control influences offspring locus of control (whether genetic, or environmentally mediated) is lacking.

Locus of control becomes more internal with age. As children grow older, they gain skills which give them more control over their environment. However, whether this or biological development is responsible for changes in locus is unclear.

== Age ==
Some studies showed that with age people develop a more internal locus of control, but other study results have been ambiguous. Longitudinal data collected by Gatz and Karel imply that internality may increase until middle age, decreasing thereafter. Noting the ambiguity of data in this area, Aldwin and Gilmer (2004) cite Lachman's claim that locus of control is ambiguous. Indeed, there is evidence here that changes in locus of control in later life relate more visibly to increased externality (rather than reduced internality) if the two concepts are taken to be orthogonal. Evidence cited by Schultz and Schultz (2005) suggests that locus of control increases in internality until middle age. The authors also note that attempts to control the environment become more pronounced between ages eight and fourteen.

Health locus of control is how people measure and understand how people relate their health to their behavior, health status and how long it may take to recover from a disease. Locus of control can influence how people think and react towards their health and health decisions. Each day we are exposed to potential diseases that may affect our health. The way we approach that reality has a lot to do with our locus of control. Sometimes it is expected to see older adults experience progressive declines in their health, for this reason it is believed that their health locus of control will be affected. However, this does not necessarily mean that their locus of control will be affected negatively but older adults may experience decline in their health and this can show lower levels of internal locus of control.

Age plays an important role in one's internal and external locus of control. When comparing a young child and an older adult with their levels of locus of control in regards to health, the older person will have more control over their attitude and approach to the situation. As people age they become aware of the fact that events outside of their own control happen and that other individuals can have control of their health outcomes.

A study published in the journal Psychosomatic Medicine examined the health effect of childhood locus of control. 7,500 British adults (followed from birth), who had shown an internal locus of control at age 10, were less likely to be overweight at age 30. The children who had an internal locus of control also appeared to have higher levels of self-esteem.

== Gender-based differences ==
As Schultz and Schultz (2005) point out, significant gender differences in locus of control have not been found for adults in the U.S. population. However, these authors also note that there may be specific sex-based differences for specific categories of items to assess locus of control; for example, they cite evidence that men may have a greater internal locus for questions related to academic achievement.

A study made by Takaki and colleagues (2006) focused on the sex or gendered differences with relationship to internal locus of control and self-efficacy in hemodialysis patients and their compliance. This study showed that women who had high internal locus of control were less compliant in regards to their health and medical advice compared to the men that participated in this study. Compliance is known to be the degree in which a person's behavior, in this case the patient, has a relationship with the medical advice. For example, a person that is compliant will correctly follow his/her doctor's advice.

== Cross-cultural and regional issues ==
The question of whether people from different cultures vary in locus of control has long been of interest to social psychologists.

Japanese people tend to be more external in locus-of-control orientation than people in the U.S.; however, differences in locus of control between different countries within Europe (and between the U.S. and Europe) tend to be small. As Berry et al. pointed out in 1992, ethnic groups within the United States have been compared on locus of control; African Americans in the U.S. are more external than whites when socioeconomic status is controlled. Berry et al. also pointed out in 1992 how research on other ethnic minorities in the U.S. (such as Hispanics) has been ambiguous. More on cross-cultural variations in locus of control can be found in Shiraev & Levy (2004). Research in this area indicates that locus of control has been a useful concept for researchers in cross-cultural psychology.

On a less broad scale, Sims and Baumann explained how regions in the United States cope with natural disasters differently. The example they used was tornados. They "applied Rotter's theory to explain why more people have died in tornado[e]s in Alabama than in Illinois". They explain that after giving surveys to residents of four counties in both Alabama and Illinois, Alabama residents were shown to be more external in their way of thinking about events that occur in their lives. Illinois residents, however, were more internal. Because Alabama residents had a more external way of processing information, they took fewer precautions prior to the appearance of a tornado. Those in Illinois, however, were more prepared, thus leading to fewer casualties.

Later studies find that these geographic differences can be explained by differences in relational mobility. Relational mobility is a measure of how much choice individuals have in terms of whom to form relationships with, including friendships, romantic partnerships, and work relations. Relational mobility is low in cultures with a subsistence economy that requires tight cooperation and coordination, such as farming, while it is high in cultures based on nomadic herding and in urban industrial cultures. A cross-cultural study found that the relational mobility is lowest in East Asian countries where rice farming is common, and highest in South American countries.

== Self-efficacy ==
Self-efficacy refers to an individual's belief in their capacity to execute behaviors necessary to produce specific performance attainments. It is a related concept introduced by Albert Bandura, and has been measured by means of a psychometric scale. It differs from locus of control by relating to competence in circumscribed situations and activities (rather than more general cross-situational beliefs about control). Bandura has also emphasised differences between self-efficacy and self-esteem, using examples where low self-efficacy (for instance, in ballroom dancing) are unlikely to result in low self-esteem because competence in that domain is not very important (see valence) to an individual. Although individuals may have a high internal health locus of control and feel in control of their own health, they may not feel efficacious in performing a specific treatment regimen that is essential to maintaining their own health. Self-efficacy plays an important role in one's health because when people feel that they have self-efficacy over their health conditions, the effects of their health becomes less of a stressor.

Smith (1989) has argued that locus of control only weakly measures self-efficacy; "only a subset of items refer directly to the subject's capabilities". Smith noted that training in coping skills led to increases in self-efficacy, but did not affect locus of control as measured by Rotter's 1966 scale.

== Stress ==
The previous section showed how self-efficacy can be related to a person's locus of control, and stress also has a relationship in these areas. Self-efficacy can be something that people use to deal with the stress that they are faced within their everyday lives. Some findings suggest that higher levels of external locus of control combined with lower levels self-efficacy are related to higher illness-related psychological distress. People who report a more external locus of control also report more concurrent and future stressful experiences and higher levels of psychological and physical problems. These people are also more vulnerable to external influences and as a result, they become more responsive to stress.

Veterans of the military forces who have spinal cord injuries and post-traumatic stress are a good group to look at in regard to locus of control and stress. Aging shows to be a very important factor that can be related to the severity of the symptoms of PTSD experienced by patients following the trauma of war. Research suggests that patients with a spinal cord injury benefit from knowing that they have control over their health problems and their disability, which reflects the characteristics of having an internal locus of control.

A study by Chung et al. (2006) focused on how the responses of spinal cord injury post-traumatic stress varied depending on age. The researchers tested different age groups including young adults, middle-aged, and elderly; the average age was 25, 48, and 65 for each group respectively. After the study, they concluded that age does not make a difference on how spinal cord injury patients respond to the traumatic events that happened. However, they did mention that age did play a role in the extent to which the external locus of control was used, and concluded that the young adult group demonstrated more external locus of control characteristics than the other age groups to which they were being compared.

== See also ==
- Aging – Biological process of getting older
- Autosuggestion – Psychological technique related to the placebo effect
- Determinism – Belief that events are determined by prior ones
- Existentialism § Angst and dread
- Explanatory style – Psychological attribute
- Free will – Ability to make choices voluntarily
- Fundamental attribution error – Psychological phenomenon
- Hypnotic Ego-Strengthening Procedure – Hypnotherapeutic procedure
- Illusion of control – False belief in an ability to control events
- Law of attraction (New Thought) – Pseudoscientific belief
- Learned helplessness – Psychological behavior
- Learned optimism – Concept in positive psychology
- Personal boundaries – Values set to limit a person's interactions
- Pessimism – Negative mental attitude
- Positive mental attitude – Importance of positive thinking as a contributing factor of success
- Self-image – Mental picture of self that comes from different sources
- Self-talk – Communication with oneself
- Sense of agency – Sense of controlling one's own actions

== Sources ==
- Abramson, Lyn Y; Seligman, Martin E; Teasdale, John D (1978). "Learned helplessness in humans: Critique and reformulation". Journal of Abnormal Psychology. 87 (1): 49–74. doi:10.1037/0021-843X.87.1.49. PMID 649856. S2CID 2845204.
- Abramson, Lyn Y; Metalsky, Gerald I; Alloy, Lauren B (1989). "Hopelessness depression: A theory-based subtype of depression". Psychological Review. 96 (2): 358–372. doi:10.1037/0033-295X.96.2.358. S2CID 18511760.
- Aldwin, C.M.; Gilmer, D.F. (2004). Health, Illness and Optimal Ageing. London: Sage. ISBN 978-0-7619-2259-9.
- Allen, David G.; Weeks, Kelly P.; Moffitt, Karen R. (2005). "Turnover Intentions and Voluntary Turnover: The Moderating Roles of Self-Monitoring, Locus of Control, Proactive Personality, and Risk Aversion". Journal of Applied Psychology. 90 (5): 980–990. doi:10.1037/0021-9010.90.5.980. PMID 16162070.
- Anderson, Craig A; Jennings, Dennis L; Arnoult, Lynn H (1988). "Validity and utility of the attributional style construct at a moderate level of specificity". Journal of Personality and Social Psychology. 55 (6): 979–990. doi:10.1037/0022-3514.55.6.979. S2CID 144258995.
- Berry, J.W.; Poortinga, Y.H.; Segall, M.H.; Dasen, P.R. (1992). Cross-cultural Psychology: Research and Applications. Cambridge: Cambridge University Press. ISBN 978-0-521-37761-4.
- Buchanan, G.M.; Seligman, M.E.P., eds. (1997). Explanatory Style. NJ: Lawrence Erlbaum Associates. ISBN 978-0-8058-0924-4.
- Burns, Melanie O; Seligman, Martin E (1989). "Explanatory style across the life span: Evidence for stability over 52 years". Journal of Personality and Social Psychology. 56 (3): 471–477. doi:10.1037/0022-3514.56.3.471. PMID 2926642.
- Cutrona, Carolyn E; Russell, Dan; Jones, R. Dallas (1984). "Cross-situational consistency in causal attributions: Does attributional style exist?". Journal of Personality and Social Psychology. 47 (5): 1043–1058. doi:10.1037/0022-3514.47.5.1043.
- Duttweiler, Patricia C (1984). "The Internal Control Index: A Newly Developed Measure of Locus of Control". Educational and Psychological Measurement. 44 (2): 209–221. doi:10.1177/0013164484442004. S2CID 144130334.
- Furnham, Adrian; Steele, Howard (1993). "Measuring locus of control: A critique of general, children's, health- and work-related locus of control questionnaires". British Journal of Psychology. 84 (4): 443–479. doi:10.1111/j.2044-8295.1993.tb02495.x. PMID 8298858.
- Eisner, J.E. (1997). "The origins of explanatory style: Trust as a determinant of pessimism and optimism". In Buchanan, G.M.; Seligman, M.E.P. (eds.). Explanatory Style. NJ: Lawrence Erlbaum Associates. pp. 49–55. ISBN 978-0-8058-0924-4.
- Gong-Guy, Elizabeth; Hammen, Constance (1980). "Causal perceptions of stressful events in depressed and nondepressed outpatients". Journal of Abnormal Psychology. 89 (5): 662–669. doi:10.1037/0021-843X.89.5.662. PMID 7410726.
- Hock, Roger R. (2008). "Are you the master of your fate?". Forty Studies that Changed Psychology (PDF) (6th ed.). Pearson. pp. 192–199. ISBN 978-0-13-504507-7. Archived from the original (PDF) on 2018-10-24.
- Holt, Cheryl L; Clark, Eddie M; Kreuter, Matthew W; Rubio, Doris M (2003). "Spiritual health locus of control and breast cancer beliefs among urban African American women". Health Psychology. 22 (3): 294–299. doi:10.1037/0278-6133.22.3.294. PMID 12790257.
- Johansson, Boo; Grant, Julia D.; Plomin, Robert; Pedersen, Nancy L.; Ahern, Frank; Berg, Stig; McClearn, Gerald E. (2001). "Health locus of control in late life: A study of genetic and environmental influences in twins aged 80 years and older". Health Psychology. 20 (1): 33–40. doi:10.1037/0278-6133.20.1.33. PMID 11199063.
- Kahoe, Richard D (1974). "Personality and achievement correlates of intrinsic and extrinsic religious orientations". Journal of Personality and Social Psychology. 29 (6): 812–818. doi:10.1037/h0036222.
- Lefcourt, Herbert M (1966). "Internal versus external control of reinforcement: A review". Psychological Bulletin. 65 (4): 206–220. doi:10.1037/h0023116. PMID 5325292.
- Lefcourt, H.M. (1976). Locus of Control: Current Trends in Theory and Research. NJ: Lawrence Erlbaum Associates. ISBN 978-0-470-15044-3.
- Maltby, J.; Day, L.; Macaskill, A. (2007). Personality, Individual Differences and Intelligence (1st ed.). Harlow: Pearson Prentice Hall. ISBN 978-0-13-129760-9.
- Meyerhoff, Michael K (2004). "Locus of Control". Pediatrics for Parents. 21 (10): 8. EBSCO 17453574.
- Norman, Paul D; Antaki, Charles (1988). "Real Events Attributional Style Questionnaire". Journal of Social and Clinical Psychology. 7 (2–3): 97–100. doi:10.1521/jscp.1988.7.2-3.97.
- Norman, P.; Bennett, P. (1995). "Health Locus of Control". In Conner, M.; Norman, P. (eds.). Predicting Health Behaviour. Buckingham: Open University Press. pp. 62–94. APA 1996-97268-003.
- Nowicki, Stephen; Strickland, Bonnie R (1973). "A locus of control scale for children". Journal of Consulting and Clinical Psychology. 40: 148–154. doi:10.1037/h0033978. S2CID 40029563.
- Peterson, Christopher; Semmel, Amy; von Baeyer, Carl; Abramson, Lyn Y; Metalsky, Gerald I; Seligman, Martin E. P (1982). "The attributional Style Questionnaire". Cognitive Therapy and Research. 6 (3): 287–299. doi:10.1007/BF01173577. S2CID 30737751.
- Robbins; Hayes (1997). "The role of causal attributions in the prediction of depression". In Buchanan, G.M.; Seligman, M.E.P. (eds.). Explanatory Style. NJ: Lawrence Erlbaum Associates. pp. 71–98. ISBN 978-0-8058-0924-4.
- Rotter, J.B. (1954). Social learning and clinical psychology. NY: Prentice-Hall.
- Rotter, Julian B (1966). "Generalized expectancies for internal versus external control of reinforcement". Psychological Monographs: General and Applied. 80 (1): 1–28. doi:10.1037/h0092976. PMID 5340840. S2CID 15355866.
- Rotter, Julian B (1975). "Some problems and misconceptions related to the construct of internal versus external control of reinforcement". Journal of Consulting and Clinical Psychology. 43: 56–67. doi:10.1037/h0076301.
- Rotter, Julian B (1990). "Internal versus external control of reinforcement: A case history of a variable". American Psychologist. 45 (4): 489–493. doi:10.1037/0003-066X.45.4.489. S2CID 41698755.
- Schultz, D.P.; Schultz, S.E. (2005). Theories of Personality (8th ed.). Wadsworth: Thomson. ISBN 978-0-534-62402-6.
- Sherer, Mark; Maddux, James E; Mercandante, Blaise; Prentice-Dunn, Steven; Jacobs, Beth; Rogers, Ronald W (1982). "The Self-Efficacy Scale: Construction and Validation". Psychological Reports. 51 (2): 663–671. doi:10.2466/pr0.1982.51.2.663. S2CID 144745134.
- Shiraev, E.; Levy, D. (2004). Cross-cultural Psychology: Critical Thinking and Contemporary Applications (2nd ed.). Boston: Pearson. ISBN 978-0-205-38612-3.
- Smith, Ronald E (1989). "Effects of coping skills training on generalized self-efficacy and locus of control". Journal of Personality and Social Psychology. 56 (2): 228–233. doi:10.1037/0022-3514.56.2.228. PMID 2926626. S2CID 14092752.
- Weiner, B., ed. (1974). Achievement Motivation and Attribution Theory. NY: General Learning Press.
- Weiner, B. (1980). Human Motivation. New York: Holt, Rinehart and Winston.
- Whyte, C. (1980). An Integrated Counseling and Learning Assistance Center. New Directions Sourcebook-Learning Assistance Centers. Jossey-Bass, Inc.
- Whyte, C. (1978). "Effective Counseling Methods for High-Risk College Freshmen". Measurement and Evaluation in Guidance. 6 (4): 198–200. doi:10.1080/00256307.1978.12022132. ERIC EJ177217.
- Xenikou, Athena; Furnham, Adrian; McCarrey, Michael (1997). "Attributional style for negative events: A proposition for a more reliable and valid measure of attributional style". British Journal of Psychology. 88: 53–69. doi:10.1111/j.2044-8295.1997.tb02620.x.

== Bibliography ==
- R. Gross, P. Humphreys, Psychology: The Science of Mind and Behaviour Psychology Press, 1994, ISBN 978-0-340-58736-2.
