= Explanatory style =

Psychological attribute

Explanatory style is a psychological attribute that indicates how people explain to themselves why they experience a particular event, either positive or negative.

== Aspects ==
=== Personal ===
This aspect covers the degree to which a person attributes the cause of an event to internal or external sources. An optimist might attribute a bad experience to a stroke of bad luck whereas a pessimist might unreasonably assume it is their fault or punishment. A person might also attribute the responsibility of their actions to external forces in a maladaptive, unhealthy way (e.g. "I had no choice but to get violent.")

=== Permanent ===
This aspect covers characteristics considered stable versus unstable (across time). An optimist would tend to define his or her failures as unstable ("I just didn't study enough for this particular test") whereas a pessimist might think, for example, "I'm never good at tests".

=== Pervasive ===
This distinction covers global versus local and/or specific and the extent of the effect. A pessimist might, for example, think that "Everywhere there is misery" and an optimist think that, "I have had dealings mostly with honest people".

== Personality ==
People who generally tend to blame themselves for negative events, believe that such events will continue indefinitely, and let such events affect many aspects of their lives display what is called a pessimistic explanatory style. Conversely, people who generally tend to blame outside forces for negative events, believe that such events will end soon, and do not let such events affect too many aspects of their lives display what is called an optimistic explanatory style.

Some research has suggested a pessimistic explanatory style may be correlated with depression and physical illness. The concept of explanatory style encompasses a wide range of possible responses to both positive and negative occurrences, rather than a black-white difference between optimism and pessimism. Also, an individual does not necessarily show a uniform explanatory style in all aspects of life, but may exhibit varying responses to different types of events.

== Literature on attributional style ==
Attributional style emerged from research on depression, with Abramson, Seligman and Teasdale (1978) arguing that a characteristic way of attributing negative outcomes – to internal, stable and global causes – would be associated with depression in response to negative events happened to them. As a diathesis–stress model of depression, the model does not predict associations of attributional style with depression in the absence of objective negative events (stressors). A meta-analysis of 104 empirical studies of the theory indicates that the predictions are supported. Data have, however, been ambiguous, and some researchers believe that the theory is well-supported, some believe that it has not had impressive empirical support and some believe that, at least in the early days of the theory, the theory was never adequately tested. One factor accounting for ambiguity in research into the model is whether researchers have assessed attributions for hypothetical events or for real events. Those studies that have looked at attributions for hypothetical events have been more supportive of the model, possibly because these studies are more likely to have controlled for event severity.

The "learned helplessness" model formed the theoretical basis of the original Abramson, Seligman, and Teasdale statement on attributional style. More recently, Abramson, Metalsky and Alloy proposed a modified "hopelessness theory". This distinguished hopeless depression and more circumscribed pessimism. It emphasizes the dimensions of stability and globality rather than internality, and suggests that stable and global attributions (rather than internal cause attributions) are associated with hopelessness depression. Hopelessness theory also highlights perceived importance and consequences of a negative outcome in addition to causal attributions as factors in clinical depression.

Developmentally, it has been suggested that attributional style originates in experiences of trust or lack of trust in events Along with evidence from twin studies for some heredity basis to attributional style., Eisner argues that repeated exposure to controllable events may foster an optimistic explanatory style, whereas repeated exposure to uncontrollable events may foster a negative attributional style. Trust in interpersonal relationships is argued to build an optimistic explanatory style.

=== Measurement ===
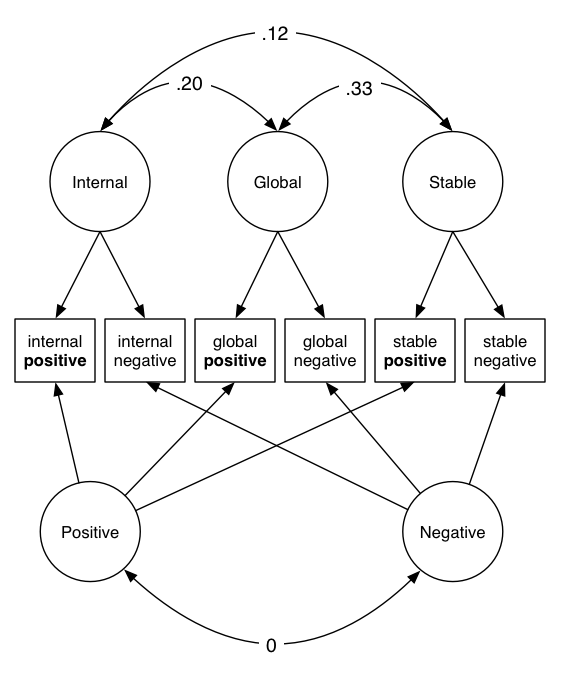
Liu Bates (2013) Model of Attributional Style

Attributional style is typically assessed using questionnaires such as the Attributional Style Questionnaire or ASQ, which assesses attributions for six negative and six positive hypothetical events, the Expanded Attributional Style Questionnaire or EASQ, which assesses attributions for eighteen hypothetical negative events, and various scales that assess attributions for real events, such as the Real Events Attributional Style Questionnaire or the Attributions Questionnaire. Although these scales provide empirical methodology for study of attributional style, and considerable empirical data support the Abramson–Seligman–Teasdale model of depression, there has been dispute about whether this concept really exists. Cutrona, Russell and Jones, for example, found evidence for considerable cross-situational variation and temporal change of attributional style in women suffering from post-partum depression. Xenikou notes, however, that Cutrona, Russell and Jones found more evidence for the cross-situational consistency of stability and globalism than of internalization. More data in support of long-term stability of attributional style has come from a diary study by Burns and Seligman. Using a technique called Content Analysis of Verbatim Explanation (CAVE), these authors found stable patterns of attributional style over a long time period.

Attributional style may be domain-specific. Using the Attributional Style Assessment Test, Anderson and colleagues found some evidence for domain-specificity of style, for instance work-related attributions vs interpersonal attributions.

Modelling of the items of the ASQ suggests that the positive and negative event information (e.g. getting a promotion, losing a job) and the causal nature of attributions – whether events are seen as global or local in scope, or as temporally stable or unstable, for instance – assess distinct factors. A global focus tends to emerge, for instance, independent of the valence of an event. Such effects are found more broadly in cognition, where they are referred to as Global versus local precedence. Optimistic and Pessimistic attributions emerged as independent of each other, supporting models in which these styles have distinct genetic and environmental origins.

=== Relationship to other constructs ===
Attributional style is, at least superficially, similar to locus of control. However, the locus of control is concerned with expectancies about the future while attribution style is concerned with attributions for the past. Whereas locus of control cuts across both positive and negative outcomes, authors in the attributional style field have distinguished between a Pessimistic Explanatory Style, in which failures are attributed to internal, stable, and global factors and successes to external, unstable, and specific causes, and an Optimistic Explanatory Style, in which successes are attributed to internal, stable, and global factors and failures to external, unstable, and specific causes.

== See also ==
- Accountability – Concept of responsibility in ethics, governance and decision-making
- Attribution (psychology) – Process by which individuals explain causes of behavior and events
- Cognitive therapy – Type of psychotherapy
- Cynicism – Attitude characterised by distrust
- Fundamental attribution error – Psychological phenomenon
- Learned helplessness – Psychological behavior
- Learned optimism – Concept in positive psychology
- Locus of control – Concept in psychology
- Optimism – Positive mental attitude
- Pessimism – Negative mental attitude
