= The Service Industry =

Pop rock band from Austin, Texas

- Origin: Austin, Texas, US
- Genres: Power pop; pop rock
- Years active: 2006–present
- Labels: Buildgut; Sauspop
- Members: Mike McCoy; Julie Lowery; Hunter Darby; Andy Thomas; Robbie Araiza; Travis Garaffa

The Service Industry is an Austin, Texas–based pop rock band. They are known for their songs about wage labor and the drudgery of working at blue-collar jobs. They released their debut album, Ranch Is the New French, in 2006, Limited Coverage and Keep the Babies Warm in 2008 and Calm Down in 2010.

== Reception ==
The Austin Chronicle's Austin Powell awarded Ranch Is the New French two and a half stars out of four. Powell wrote that the band "spits in your food, doesn't wash, and takes smoke breaks every 15 minutes, but also serves up decent indie rock, like the Pixiesish 'Not in My Section' and 'My Job Is Gay.'" Robert Christgau wrote that the album's songs conveyed "Wage servitude and the righteous haters who are stuck in it--the lowdown".

A review of the band's second album, Limited Coverage, in Houston Press concluded that the band "...may have let a little too much of that workplace drudgery leach into their songs, but that's no reason to garnish their wages." The Austin Chronicle's Greg Beets gave it three out of four stars, calling it "the pitch-perfect soundtrack for your next union potluck." Mike Faloon of Razorcake wrote in his review of the album that the band's "...lyrics rarely rise above cliché," while adding that he "kind of like[d] their country rock, especially when Curt Kirkwood of the Meat Puppets guests." Christgau described the album as "A little night music about too many day jobs".

An AllMusic review of the band's third album, released in 2008, Keep the Babies Warm, awarded it three stars out of five. The same review stated that "A little more anger and emotion could make this album a great listen, rather than being merely enjoyable." Beets of The Austin Chronicle gave the album 3 stars out of 4, writing that "the Service Industry's loyal opposition offers catchy commiseration that keeps the glass half full." Adam Newton of Envy criticized the album for featuring too much political commentary.

Jim Caligiuri of The Austin Chronicle gave the band's fourth album, Calm Down, three stars out of four, writing that the album "finds the local crew all over the musical map as ever, skewering modern life with spiked assurance." Benjamin Olivo of My San Antonio also reviewed the album favorably, describing it as "a bouncy delight, sugary and subversive at the same time. It's Nick Lowe sitting in and writing for X."

== Personnel ==
- Mike McCoy – vocals
- Julie Lowery – vocals
- Hunter Darby – bass and vocals
- Andy Thomas – guitar
- Robbie Araiza – guitar
- Travis Garaffa – drums, percussion, and vocals

== Discography ==
- Ranch Is the New French (Buildgut, 2006)
- Limited Coverage (Sauspop, 2008)
- Keep the Babies Warm (Sauspop, 2008)
- Calm Down (Sauspop, 2010)
