= Silver Lining =

Silver Lining, A Silver Lining or The Silver Lining may refer to:

- Silver lining (idiom), a metaphor for optimism in the common English-language idiom "Every cloud has a silver lining"

== Film ==
- The Silver Lining (1915 film), a short directed by B. Reeves Eason
- The Silver Lining (1919 film), a British silent sports film
- The Silver Lining (1921 film), a silent drama directed by Roland West
- The Silver Lining (1927 film), a British silent drama directed by Thomas Bentley
- The Silver Lining (1932 film), a film starring Maureen O'Sullivan

== Music ==
=== Albums ===
- Silver Lining (Bonnie Raitt album), 2002
- Silver Lining (Nils Lofgren album), 1991
- A Silver Lining, by We Shot the Moon, 2009
- The Silver Lining (Earshot album), 2008
- The Silver Lining (Soul Asylum album), 2006
- The Silver Lining: The Songs of Jerome Kern, by Tony Bennett and Bill Charlap, 2015
- Silver Linings, by Less Than Jake, 2020
- Silver Lining, by Jake Miller, 2018
- Silver Linings, by Milow, 2014

=== Songs ===
- "Silver Lining (Crazy 'Bout You)", by Jessie J from the film Silver Linings Playbook, 2012
- "Silver Lining" (Laufey song), from A Matter of Time, 2025
- "(Fuck A) Silver Lining", by Panic! at the Disco, 2018
- "Silver Lining", by Ace of Hearts, a band formed by Alpharad, 2020
- "Silver Lining", by Beulah from The Coast Is Never Clear
- "Silver Lining", by David Gray from White Ladder
- "Silver Lining", by Gang of Four from Hard
- "Silver Lining", by Garfunkel and Oates
- "Silver Lining", by Hunter Brothers from State of Mind
- "Silver Lining", by Hurts from Happiness
- "Silver Lining", by Kacey Musgraves from Same Trailer Different Park
- "Silver Lining", by Lee DeWyze from Frames
- "Silver Lining", by Maya Delilah
- "Silver Lining", by Mt. Joy
- "Silver Lining", by Nadia Ali from Embers
- "Silver Lining", by Neck Deep from Rain in July
- "Silver Lining", by Polly Scattergood from Arrows
- "Silver Lining", by Rilo Kiley from Under the Blacklight
- "Silver Lining", by Stiff Little Fingers from Go for It
- "Silver Lining (Clap Your Hands)", by Imany, 2016
- "Silver Linings", by Frank Fischer from Café del Mar
- "Silver Lining", by grentperez
- "Silver Lining", by Dayglow

== Television ==
- Silver Lining (audio drama), a Bernice Summerfield story based on Doctor Who
- The Silver Lining (TV series), a 1997 Singaporean Chinese drama series
- Silver Lining, a 2010 Singaporean series starring Richard Ng
- "Silver Lining" (The Jeffersons), an episode
- "Silver Lining" (Law & Order: Criminal Intent), an episode
- Silver Lining, a 2022 Hong Kong one-episode television drama

== Other uses ==
- Silver Lining (play), a play by Sandi Toksvig
- The Silver Lining (video game), a 2010 fan-created game based on Sierra's King's Quest series
- Silver Lining Foundation a Chinese non-profit organization for orphans and cerebral palsy victims
- Silver Lining Productions, a former UK-based animation studio and licensing firm, later a subsidiary of Chorion
- Silver Lining (horse), a Thoroughbred racehorse, three-time Hong Kong Horse of the Year
- Silver Lining, a gardening book by Karen Platt
- The Silver Lining, a 1949–1964 BBC radio programme presented by Stuart Hibberd
- Silverlining, the disk drive formatting software utility from LaCie

== See also ==
- My Silver Lining (disambiguation)
- Silver Line (disambiguation)
- Silver Linings Playbook
- Silver Lining Suite, an album by Hiromi Uehara
- "The Lining Is Silver", a song by Relient K from The Nashville Tennis EP, released with The Bird and the Bee Sides
