= Social cognition =

Study of cognitive processes involved in social interactions

Social cognition is a topic within psychology that focuses on how people process, store, and apply information about other people and social situations. It focuses on the role that cognitive processes play in social interactions.

More technically, social cognition refers to how people deal with information about conspecifics (members of the same species) or even across species (such as pets), and includes four stages: encoding, storage, retrieval, and processing. In the area of social psychology, social cognition refers to a specific approach in which these processes are studied according to the methods of cognitive psychology and information processing theory. According to this view, social cognition is a level of analysis that aims to understand social psychological phenomena by investigating the cognitive processes that underlie them. The major concerns of the approach are the processes involved in the perception, judgment, and memory of social stimuli; the effects of social and affective factors on information processing; and the behavioral and interpersonal consequences of cognitive processes. This level of analysis may be applied to any content area within social psychology, including research on intrapersonal, interpersonal, intragroup, and intergroup processes.

The term social cognition has been used in multiple areas in psychology and cognitive neuroscience, most often to refer to various social abilities disrupted in autism, schizophrenia and psychopathy. In cognitive neuroscience the biological basis of social cognition is investigated. Developmental psychologists study the development of social cognition abilities.

== History ==
Social cognition came to prominence with the rise of cognitive psychology in the late 1960s and early 1970s and is now the dominant model and approach in mainstream social psychology. Common to social cognition theories is the idea that information is represented in the brain as "cognitive elements" such as schemas, attributions, or stereotypes. A focus on how these cognitive elements are processed is often employed. Social cognition therefore applies and extends many themes, theories, and paradigms from cognitive psychology that can be identified in reasoning (representativeness heuristic, base rate fallacy and confirmation bias), attention (automaticity and priming) and memory (schemas, primacy and recency). It is likely that social psychology has always had a more cognitive than general psychology approach, as it traditionally discussed internal mental states such as beliefs and desires when mainstream psychology was dominated by behaviorism.

It has been suggested that other disciplines in social psychology such as social identity theory and social representations may be seeking to explain largely the same phenomena as social cognition, and that these different disciplines might be merged into a "coherent integrated whole". A parallel paradigm has arisen in the study of action, termed motor cognition, which is concerned with understanding the representation of action and the associated process.

== Development ==
According to the received view in cognitive sciences, the development of the human ability to process, store, and apply information about others begins in social learning at the onset of life. Very young organisms cognize social situations in social interaction with their caregivers when knowledge is developing yet limited. The essential question in studying Social cognition is how this ability appears and what neurophysiological processes underlie it in organisms in the sensorimotor stage of development with only simple reflexes which do not maintain bilateral communication. Professor Michael Tomasello introduced the psychological construct of shared intentionality to explain cognition beginning in the earlier developmental stage through unaware collaboration in mother-child dyads. Other researchers developed the notion, by observing this collaborative interaction from different perspectives, e.g., psychophysiology, and neurobiology.

The primary neurophysiological frameworks elucidating the bottom-up emergence of primordial cognition consist of the following paradigms: Traditional computational models conceptualize cognitive processes predominantly as responses elicited by exogenous stimuli (evoked neural activity). Conversely, the enactive brain framework inverts this paradigm, demonstrating that cognition is fundamentally initiated endogenously. Zhang et al. posited that "the dynamic regulation of brain activity in response to task situations is the core brain mechanism of mental processing." This perspective asserts that the central nervous system maintains continuous, high-amplitude spontaneous neural oscillations independent of external sensory input. Within the framework of predictive coding, these intrinsic neural patterns function as proactive internal simulations or Bayesian priors. Consequently, cognition emerges as the neural architecture continuously minimizes prediction error—or the statistical distance—between these endogenous spontaneous bursts and incoming sensory signals. Thus, cognitive progression is intrinsically driven by the brain's requirement to dynamically reconcile its internal bioelectric fluctuations with environmental reality.

The embodied cognition approach posits that foundational mental processes do not consist of abstract computational codes; rather, they are fundamentally grounded in the somatic systems that govern motor control and monitor sensorimotor interactions. Specifically, "high order cognitive functions are grounded in the sensory-motor system." This paradigm relies on the principle of neural exploitation, wherein the brain repurposes phylogenetically older sensorimotor circuits to support ontogenetically newer, higher-level cognitive faculties, such as linguistic processing and conceptual categorization. For instance, when an organism observes an object, the central nervous system executes an "as-if" neural simulation, activating canonical neurons within the premotor and parietal cortices. These neural populations simulate the motor kinematics required to interact with or grasp the object, thereby deriving the abstract conceptual representation of the stimulus directly from the motor system.

The mother-fetus neurocognitive model hypothesis attempts to account for the neurophysiological mechanisms underlying shared intentionality, spanning from interpersonal dynamics to individual neuronal interactions. By establishing this neurophysiological hypothesis, Latvian Prof. Igor Val Danilov expanded the use of the term shared intentionality to include consideration of the interaction between an embryo and her mother. From this perspective, abilities to process, store, and apply information about others develop from the prenatal period. This insight continues the reflections of great thinkers (e.g., Kant) and leading child development theorists (beginning from Montessori and Vygotsky) about the beginning of cognition in interactions with the environment. Based on experimental data from research on child behavior in the prenatal period, and advances in inter-brain neuroscience research, this neurophysiological hypothesis introduced the notion of non-local neuronal coupling of the mother and fetus neuronal networks. The notion of non-local neuronal coupling filled a gap in knowledge – both in the Core Knowledge Theory and the group of positions in Externalism – about the beginning of cognition, the gap that the binding problem has also shown. This insight also shed light on neurophysiological processes that underlie the human ability to process, store, and apply information about other people and social situations beginning from the reflexes stage of development, when even aware goal-directed behavior is questioned. While exactly due to the ability of shared intentionality, very young babies express social behavior. This ability manifests in recognizing and selectively responding to social stimuli. From this perspective, Social cognition contributes to cognitive development of newborns and even embryos when communication is still impossible. A development of the human ability to process, store, and apply information about others begins in the prenatal period.

== Social schemas ==
One theory of social cognition is social schema theory, although it is not the basis of all social cognition studies (for example, see attribution theory). Social schema theory builds on and uses terminology from schema theory in cognitive psychology, which describes how ideas or "concepts" are represented in the mind and how they are categorized. According to this view, when we see or think of a concept a mental representation or schema is "activated" bringing to mind other information which is linked to the original concept by association. This activation often happens unconsciously. As a result of activating such schemas, judgements are formed which go beyond the information actually available, since many of the associations the schema evokes extend outside the given information. This may influence social cognition and behaviour regardless of whether these judgements are accurate or not. For example, if an individual is introduced as a teacher, then a "teacher schema" may be activated. Subsequently, we might associate this person with wisdom or authority, or past experiences of teachers that we remember and consider important.

When a schema is more accessible it can be more quickly activated and used in a particular situation. Two cognitive processes that increase accessibility of schemas are salience and priming. Salience is the degree to which a particular social object stands out relative to other social objects in a situation. The higher the salience of an object the more likely that schemas for that object will be made accessible. For example, if there is one female in a group of seven males, female gender schemas may be more accessible and influence the group's thinking and behavior toward the female group member. Priming refers to any experience immediately prior to a situation that causes a schema to be more accessible. For example, watching a scary movie late at night might increase the accessibility of frightening schemas, increasing the likelihood that a person will perceive shadows and background noises as potential threats.

Social cognition researchers are interested in how new information is integrated into pre-established schemas, especially when the information contrasts with the existing schema. For example, a student may have a pre-established schema that all teachers are assertive and bossy. After encountering a teacher who is timid and shy, a social cognition researcher might be interested in how the student will integrate this new information with his/her existing teacher schema. Pre-established schemas tend to guide attention to new information, as people selectively attend to information that is consistent with the schema and ignore information that is inconsistent. This is referred to as a confirmation bias. Sometimes inconsistent information is sub-categorized and stored away as a special case, leaving the original schema intact without any alterations. This is referred to as subtyping.

Social cognition researchers are also interested in the regulation of activated schemas. It is believed that the situational activation of schemas is automatic, meaning that it is outside individual conscious control. In many situations however, the schematic information that has been activated may be in conflict with the social norms of the situation in which case an individual is motivated to inhibit the influence of the schematic information on their thinking and social behavior. According to Patricia G. Devine (the dual-process framework), while the activation of stereotypes and social schemas (schematic information) is automatic, individuals who are motivated by egalitarian social norms can actively inhibit the influence of that information if they have the necessary cognitive resources. Susan T. Fiske and Steven L. Neuberg (the Continuum Model of Processing) argued that individuals transition from automatic, category-based schema processing to controlled, individuating processing when situational demands or normative motivations dictate that relying on the schema is inappropriate. Furthermore, research mapped out the exact executive operations and cognitive costs associated with the intentional, motivated inhibition of activated social schemata when they conflict with situational goals. Whether a person will successfully regulate the application of the activated schemas is dependent on individual differences in self-regulatory ability and the presence of situational impairments to executive control. High self-regulatory ability and the lack of situational impairments on executive functioning increase the likelihood that individuals will successfully inhibit the influence of automatically activated schemas on their thinking and social behavior. When people stop suppressing the influence of the unwanted thoughts, a rebound effect can occur where the thought becomes hyper-accessible.

== Centrality ==
Social cognition refers to the cognitive processes involved in perceiving, interpreting, and responding to social information. It plays a central role in human behavior and is critical for navigating social interactions and relationships. There are several examples that demonstrate the centrality of social cognition in human experience.

=== Perceiving faces everywhere ===
Humans are highly attuned to detecting and recognizing faces, even in inanimate objects. This phenomenon, known as pareidolia, is thought to be an evolutionary adaptation that helps humans quickly identify potential threats and allies in their environment. Research shows that the representation of illusory faces is confined to occipital-temporal face-selective visual cortex: the Fusiform Face Area (FFA) located in the fusiform gyrus, the Occipital Face Area (OFA) located in the inferior occipital gyrus, and the face-selective region in the Superior Temporal Sulcus (STS). "The temporal dynamics reveal a striking evolution in how illusory faces are represented relative to human faces and matched objects. Illusory faces are initially represented more similarly to real faces than matched objects are, but within ~250 ms, the representation transforms, and they become equivalent to ordinary objects."

=== Point-light walkers ===
Point-light walkers are animations of people walking that are created by attaching small lights to their joints and recording their movements in a dark room. Research found that “10–12 such elements in adequate motion combinations in proximal stimulus evoke a compelling impression of human walking, running, dancing, etc.” Prof. Dittrich et al. (1996), and later Prof. Costa et al. (2026), examined whether it is possible to judge the emotional state of a human body from motion information alone; the results for upright biological-motion displays (Point-Light Displays) were significantly above chance. This outcome shows that emotions like fear, anger, grief, joy, surprise, and disgust can be decoded from biological motion. This ability highlights the importance of social cognition in recognizing and interpreting human movement and behavior.

=== Data on social-brain evolution ===
Research has shown that the evolution of the human brain is closely tied to the development of social cognition. The prefrontal cortex, a region of the brain involved in higher-level cognitive processes such as decision-making and social behavior, has undergone significant expansion in humans compared to other primates. This expansion is thought to reflect the increased importance of social cognition in human evolution.

=== Pain of social exclusion ===
Social exclusion is a powerful social stressor that can elicit emotional and physiological responses similar to physical pain. Available evidence points to a connection between physical and social pain, with the anterior cingulate cortex playing a key role. This response highlights the importance of social connections and acceptance for human well-being and underscores the centrality of social cognition in regulating social behavior.

== Cultural differences ==
Social psychologists have become increasingly interested in the influence of culture on social cognition. Although people of all cultures use schemas to understand the world, the content of schemas has been found to differ for individuals based on their cultural upbringing. For example, one study interviewed a Scottish settler and a Bantu herdsman from Swaziland and compared their schemas about cattle. Because cattle are essential to the lifestyle of the Bantu people, the Bantu herdsman's schemas for cattle were far more extensive than the schemas of the Scottish settler. The Bantu herdsman was able to distinguish his cattle from dozens of others, while the Scottish settler was not.

Cultural influences have been found to shape some of the basic ways in which people automatically perceive and think about their environment. For example, a number of studies have found that people who grow up in East Asian cultures such as China and Japan tend to develop holistic thinking styles, whereas people brought up in Western cultures like Australia and the USA tend to develop analytic thinking styles. The typically Eastern holistic thinking style is a type of thinking in which people focus on the overall context and the ways in which objects relate to each other. For example, if an Easterner was asked to judge how a classmate is feeling then he/she might scan everyone's face in the class, and then use this information to judge how the individual is feeling. On the other hand, the typically Western analytic thinking style is a type of thinking style in which people focus on individual objects and neglect to consider the surrounding context. For example, if a Westerner was asked to judge how a classmate is feeling, then he or she might focus only on the classmate's face in order to make the judgment.

Nisbett (2003) suggested that cultural differences in social cognition may stem from the various philosophical traditions of the East (i.e. Confucianism and Buddhism) versus the Greek philosophical traditions (i.e. of Aristotle and Plato) of the West. Other research indicates that differences in social cognition may originate from physical differences in the environments of the two cultures. One study found that scenes from Japanese cities were 'busier' than those in the US as they contain more objects which compete for attention. In this study, the Eastern holistic thinking style (and focus on the overall context) was attributed to the busier nature of the Japanese physical environment.

Later studies find that these differences in cognitive style can be explained by differences in relational mobility. Relational mobility is a measure of how much choice individuals have in terms of whom to form relationships with, including friendships, romantic partnerships, and work relations. Relational mobility is low in cultures with a subsistence economy that requires tight cooperation and coordination, such as farming, while it is high in cultures based on nomadic herding and in urban industrial cultures. A cross-cultural study found that the relational mobility is lowest in East Asian countries where rice farming is common, and highest in South American countries.

These cultural influences might have also been results of the Chameleon Effect. The Chameleon Effect is when people unconsciously mimic the behaviors, gestures, and expressions of others. Chartrand and Bargh (1999) found that people favor those who were subtly mimicking them over those who weren't; those who were mimicking others were more likely to be liked and have more friendly interactions with others. The intensity of the Chameleon Effect highly depends on the culture norm and what is seen as acceptable. In a culture promoting collectivism, which highly values group harmony and requires one to actively fit in, this subtle mimicking is more likely to occur as it is socially accepted. However, culture promoting individualism, which prioritizes independence over group harmony, mimicry might be less common or even seen as intrusive. Therefore, the intensity of the Chameleon Effect highly depends on the culture norm and what is seen as acceptable.

== Social cognitive neuroscience ==
Early interest in the relationship between brain function and social cognition includes the case of Phineas Gage, whose behaviour was reported to have changed after an accident damaged one or both of his frontal lobes. More recent neuropsychological studies have shown that brain injuries disrupt social cognitive processes. For example, damage to the frontal lobes can affect emotional responses to social stimuli and performance on theory of mind tasks. In the temporal lobe, damage to the fusiform gyrus can lead to the inability to recognize faces: lesions localized to the fusiform gyrus within the ventral temporal lobe characteristically induce prosopagnosia, an impairment characterized by the selective inability to recognize facial configurations despite intact low-level visual processing.

People with psychological disorders such as autism, psychosis, mood disorder, posttraumatic stress disorder (PTSD), Williams syndrome, antisocial personality disorder, Fragile X, Turner's syndrome and ADHD show differences in social behavior compared to their unaffected peers. Parents with PTSD show disturbances in at least one aspect of social cognition: namely, joint attention with their young children only after a laboratory-induced relational stressor as compared to healthy parents without PTSD. However, whether social cognition is underpinned by domain-specific neural mechanisms is still an open issue. There is now an expanding research field examining how such conditions may bias cognitive processes involved in social interaction, or conversely, how such biases may lead to the symptoms associated with the condition.

The development of social cognitive processes in infants and children has also been researched extensively (see developmental psychology). For example, it has been suggested that some aspects of psychological processes that promote social behavior (such as facial recognition) may be innate. Consistent with this, very young babies recognize and selectively respond to social stimuli such as the voice, face and scent of their mother. From the perspective of the shared intentionality hypothesis, social behavior of these organisms with simple reflexes emerges due to social cognition in social interaction with caregivers. Numerous hyper-scanning research studies in adults and mother-child dyads support the shared intentionality nature of social behavior in young children (see the section Development).

== See also ==
- Behavioral sink
- Cognitive dissonance
- Distributed cognition
- Empathy
- Joint attention
- Language
- Neurodevelopmental framework for learning
- Observational learning
- Online participation
- Paranoid social cognition
- Relational mobility
- Embodied cognition
- Shared intentionality
- Situated cognition
- Social cognitive theory
- Social cognitive theory of morality
- Social emotion
- Social intelligence
- Social neuroscience
