= Silver lining (idiom) =

English metaphor for optimism

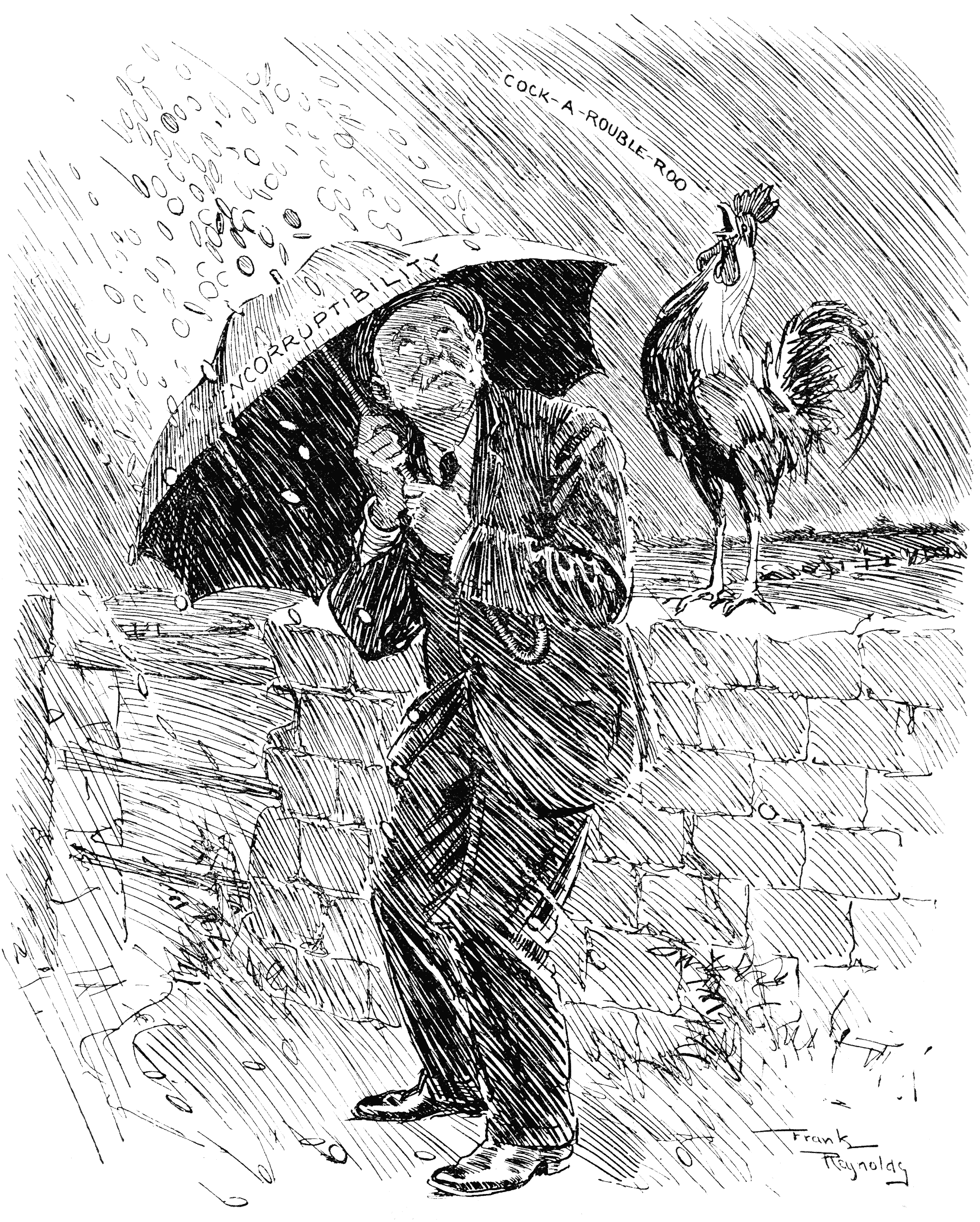
A 1920 cartoon depicting George Lansbury. Captions: Under a cloud (with a golden lining). Comrade Lansbury. "Thanks to my faithful brolski not a drop has touched me." ["Cock-a-rouble-roo" from "Daily Herald" bird.] Possibly reflecting an allegation of Soviet funding for the Independent Labour Party. Lansbury founded the Daily Herald.

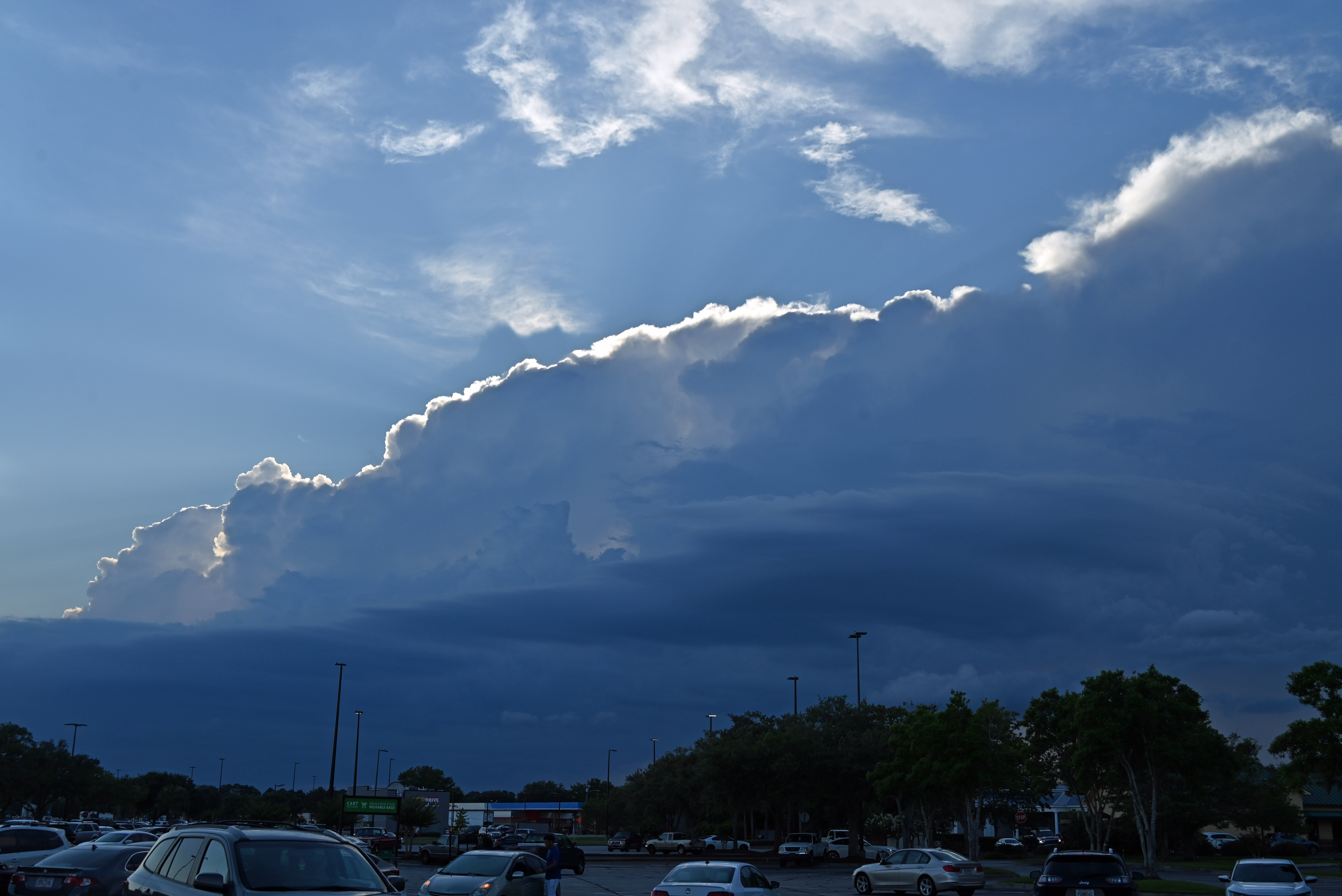
A cloud with a silver lining

A silver lining is a metaphor for optimism in vernacular English, which means a negative occurrence may have a positive aspect to it.

== Origin ==
John Milton coined the phrase 'silver lining' in his poem Comus: A Mask Presented at Ludlow Castle, 1634:

I see ye visibly, and now believe
That he, the Supreme Good, to whom all things ill
Are but as slavish officers of vengeance,
Would send a glistering guardian, if need were
To keep my life and honor unassailed.
Was I deceived, or did a sable cloud
Turn forth her silver lining on the night?
I did not err; there does a sable cloud
Turn forth her silver lining on the night,
And casts a gleam over this tufted grove.

It is a metaphor referring to the silvery, shining edges of a cloud backlit by the Sun or the Moon.

== See also ==
- Idiom
- Felix culpa
- The old man lost his horse
- Silver Lining (disambiguation)
- Is the glass half empty or half full?
