= Neurodevelopmental framework for learning =

Neurodevelopmental framework for learning, like all frameworks, is an organizing structure through which learners and learning can be understood. Intelligence theories and neuropsychology inform many of them. The framework described below is a neurodevelopmental framework for learning. The neurodevelopmental framework was developed by the All Kinds of Minds Institute in collaboration with Dr. Mel Levine and the University of North Carolina's Clinical Center for the Study of Development and Learning. It is similar to other neuropsychological frameworks, including Alexander Luria's cultural-historical psychology and psychological activity theory, but also draws from disciplines such as speech-language pathology, occupational therapy, and physical therapy. It also shares components with other frameworks, some of which are listed below. However, it does not include a general intelligence factor (abbreviated g), since the framework is used to describe learners in terms of profiles of strengths and weaknesses, as opposed to using labels, diagnoses, or broad ability levels. This framework was also developed to link with academic skills, such as reading and writing. Implications for education are discussed below as well as the connections to and compatibilities with several major educational policy issues.

This framework consists of 8 constructs, sometimes referred to as systems.

== Constructs ==
- attention – mental energy, processing incoming information, and regulating output
- temporal-sequential ordering – processing and production of material that is serial
- spatial-ordering – processing and production of material that is visual and/or spatial
- memory – storage and retrieval of information (after brief or long delays), or mentally suspending information while using it
- language – understanding and use of linguistic sounds, words, sentences, and discourse
- neuromotor function – control over movement of large muscles, hands, and fingers
- social cognition – navigation of interaction with others, including verbal and nonverbal tactics
- higher order cognition – complex and sophisticated thinking

In addition to the 8 constructs, this framework includes several "cross-construct" phenomena: rate alignment (working at optimal speed), strategy use (working and thinking tactically), chunk size capacity – the amount of material that can be processed, stored or generated, and metacognition (degree of knowledge about learning and insight into one's own neurodevelopmental strengths and weaknesses).

== Other learning frameworks ==
Numerous frameworks are available that describe development and help to organize observations of learning behavior. Intelligence theories date back to the 19th century and the early 20th century, such as Charles Spearman's concept of general intelligence factor, or g. Though there were exceptions (e.g., Thorndike), most theories of intelligence included g, a general index of cognitive ability. An intelligence theory that has drawn considerable attention is Cattell-Horn-Carroll (CHC), which is grounded in extensive factor analytic research from cognitive ability test databases, as well as studies of development and heritability. CHC is actually an amalgam of Cattell-Horn Gf-Gc theory and Carroll's three-tier model. proposed a framework with the broadest level a general intelligence factor conceptually similar to Spearman's g. This general factor was divided into eight narrower abilities, each consisting of narrow factors. Cattell-Horn's model was similar on several fronts, including its hierarchical structure. In the 1990s, Carroll's model was combined with Cattell-Horn's work by Flanagan, McGrew, and Ortiz (2000). CHC contains three strata: stratum III is g, stratum II consists of broad cognitive abilities, and stratum I consists of narrow cognitive abilities. The broad cognitive abilities (stratum II) include fluid reasoning (or Gf, forming and recognizing logical relationships among patterns, inferencing, and transforming novel stimuli) and comprehension-knowledge (or Gc, using language and acquired knowledge). There is on-going discussion by proponents of CHC about g's importance in the framework. The Structure of Intellect (SOI) model includes three axes (with 5-6 components per axis) that form a 3-dimensional cube; because each dimension is independent, there are 150 different potential aspects of intelligence. Howard Gardner has written about several categories of intelligence, as opposed to a hierarchical model. Neuropsychologists have sought to map various mental abilities onto brain structures. In so doing they have created frameworks that include factors and sub-components. Luria organized brain functions into now-familiar categories, such as speech and memory. Luria's conception of attention included three units: Unit 1 (brainstem and related areas) regulates cortical activity and levels of alertness, Unit 2 (lateral and posterior regions of neocortex) analyzes and stores newly received information, and Unit 3 (frontal lobes) programs and regulates activity. More recently, the PASS (Planning, Attention, Successive, and Simultaneous) model yields both a global index of ability while emphasizing specific cognitive processes. For example, "successive" refers to information that is perceived, interpreted, and/or remembered in a serial order (e.g., language), whereas "simultaneous" refers to material that is perceived, interpreted, and/or remembered as a whole (e.g. visual-spatial).
