= Agathism =

The doctrine that all things tend towards ultimate good

Agathism, from the Greek ἀγαθός agathos (good) is, according to the Oxford English Dictionary, "The doctrine that all things tend towards ultimate good, as distinguished from optimism, which holds that all things are now for the best". An agathist accepts that evil and misfortune will ultimately happen, but that the eventual outcome leads towards the good. In other words, an agathist may see the world as essentially good but a place in which bad things can and do happen to good people.

== In theology ==
Agathism is offered as an apologetic in theodicy to address the problem of reconciling a benevolent God with the existence of evil in the world. A form of agathism is found in Muslim thought and in some Christian beliefs. The Seventh-day Adventist Church believes that even the punishment of a soul in hell is not eternal, but that the wicked perish. In theologies which hold human history to be a narrative authored by God, agathism forms the basis for the development of Messianism.

== See also ==
- Positive psychology
- Ethics
- Morality
- Theology
- Agathology
