= Optimism =

Positive mental attitude

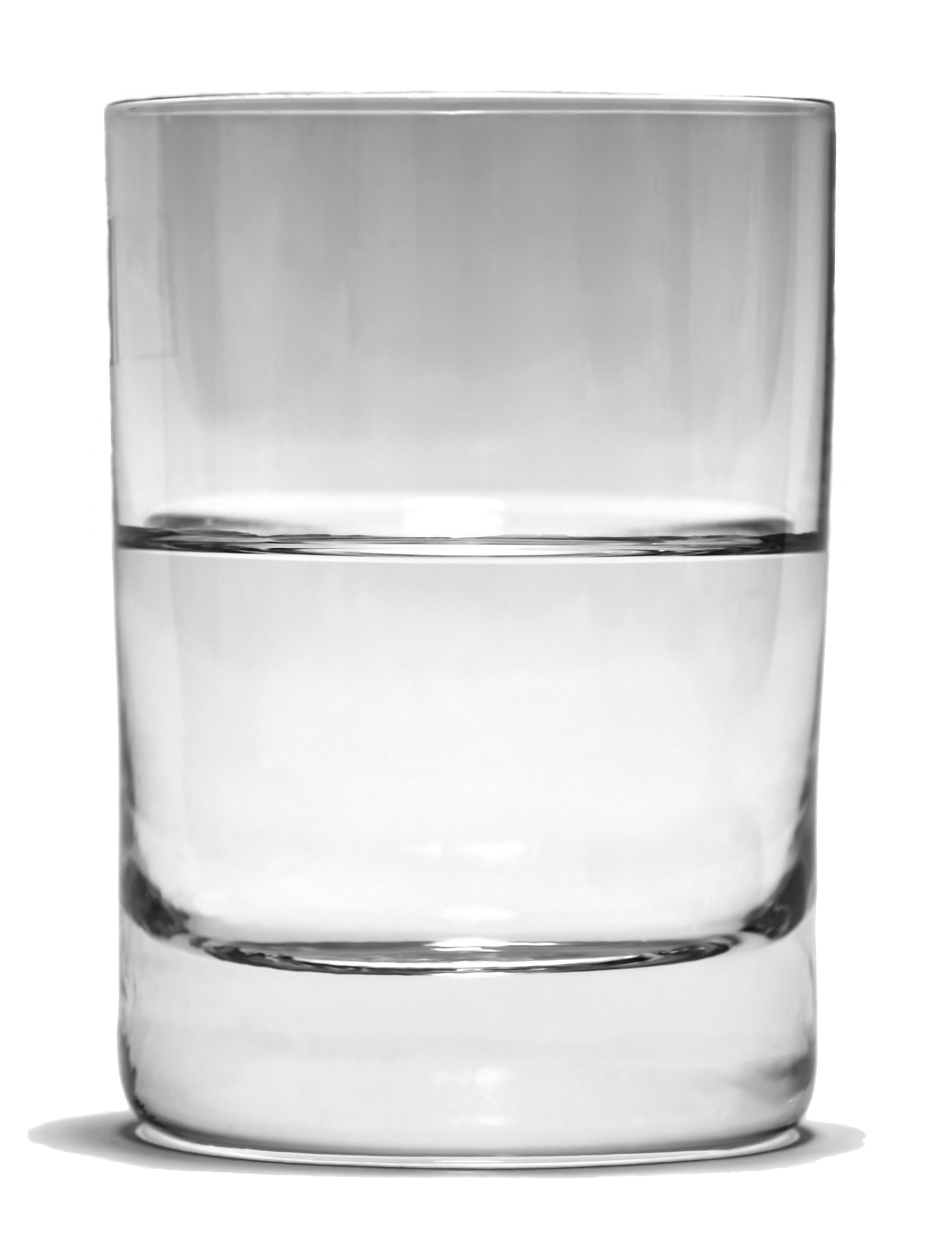
Half a glass of water, illustration of two different mental attitudes, optimism (half full) and pessimism (half empty)

Optimism is the attitude or mindset of expecting events to lead to particularly positive, favorable, desirable, and hopeful outcomes. A common idiom used to illustrate optimism versus pessimism is a glass filled with water to the halfway point: an optimist is said to see the glass as half full, while a pessimist sees the glass as half empty. In ordinary English, optimism may be synonymous with idealism—often, unrealistic or foolish optimism in particular.

The term derives from the Latin optimum, meaning "best". To be optimistic, in the typical sense of the word, is to expect the best possible outcome from any given situation. This is usually referred to in psychology as dispositional optimism. It reflects a belief that future conditions will work out for the best. As a trait, it fosters resilience in the face of stress.

Theories of optimism include dispositional models and models of explanatory style. Methods to measure optimism have been developed within both of these theoretical approaches, such as various forms of the Life Orientation Test for the original dispositional definition of optimism and the Attributional Style Questionnaire designed to test optimism in terms of explanatory style.

Variation in optimism between people is somewhat heritable and reflects biological trait systems to some degree. A person's optimism is also influenced by environmental factors, including family environment, and may be learnable. Optimism may also be related to health.

== Psychological optimism ==
=== Dispositional optimism ===
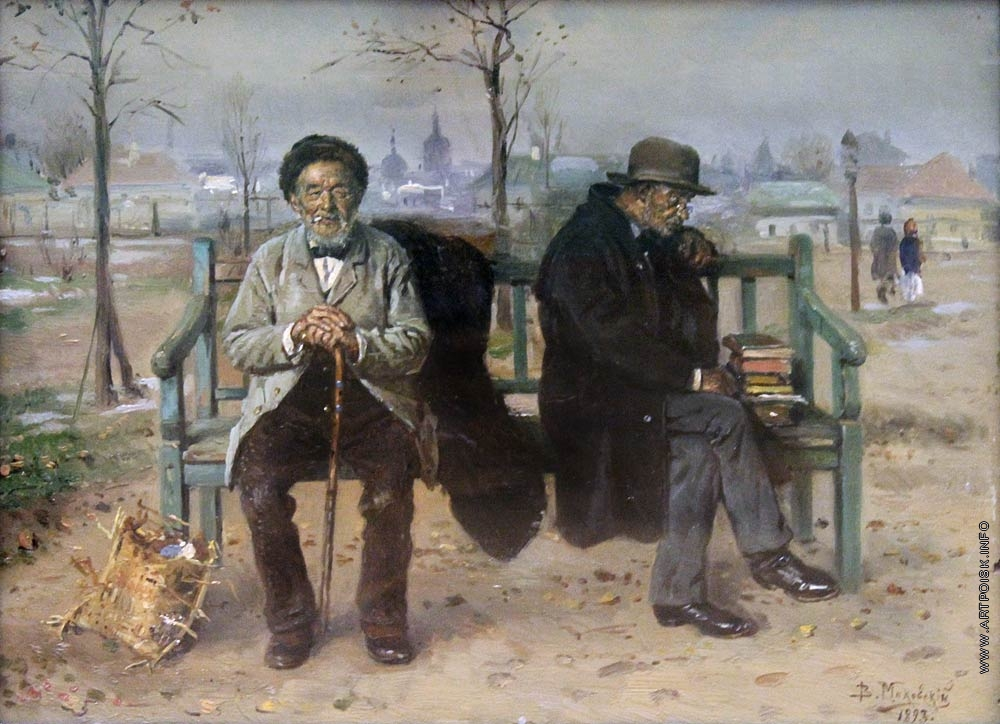
An optimist and a pessimist, Vladimir Makovsky, 1893

Researchers operationalize the term "optimism" differently depending on their research. As with any trait characteristic, there are several ways to evaluate optimism, such as the Life Orientation Test (LOT), an eight-item scale developed in 1985 by Michael Scheier and Charles Carver.

Dispositional optimism and pessimism are typically assessed by asking people whether they expect future outcomes to be beneficial or negative (see below). The LOT returns separate optimism and pessimism scores for each individual. Behaviourally, these two scores correlate around r=0.5. Optimistic scores on this scale predict better outcomes in relationships, higher social status, and reduced loss of well-being following adversity. Health-preserving behaviors are associated with optimism while health-damaging behaviors are associated with pessimism.

Some have argued that optimism is the opposite end of a single dimension with pessimism, with any distinction between them reflecting factors such as social desirability. Confirmatory modelling, however, supports a two-dimensional model and the two dimensions predict different outcomes. Genetic modelling confirms this independence, showing that pessimism and optimism are inherited as independent traits, with the typical correlation between them emerging as a result of a general well-being factor and family environment influences. Patients with high dispositional optimism appear to have stronger immune systems since optimism buffers against psychological stressors. Optimists appear to live longer.

=== Explanatory style ===
Explanatory style is distinct from dispositional theories of optimism. While related to life-orientation measures of optimism, attributional style theory suggests that dispositional optimism and pessimism are reflections of the ways people explain events, i.e., that attributions cause these dispositions. An optimist would view defeat as temporary, as something that does not apply to other cases, and as something that is not their fault. Measures of attributional style distinguish three dimensions among explanations for events: Whether these explanations draw on internal versus external causes; whether the causes are viewed as stable versus unstable; and whether explanations apply globally versus being situationally specific. In addition, the measures distinguish attributions for positive and negative events.

Optimistic people attribute internal, stable, and global explanations to good things. Pessimistic explanations attribute these traits of stability, globality, and internality to negative events, such as relationship difficulty. Models of optimistic and pessimistic attributions show that attributions themselves are a cognitive style – individuals who tend to focus on the global explanations do so for all types of events, and the styles correlate among each other. In addition, individuals vary in how optimistic their attributions are for good events and on how pessimistic their attributions are for bad events. Still, these two traits of optimism and pessimism are un-correlated.

There is much debate about the relationship between explanatory style and optimism. Some researchers argue that optimism is simply the lay-term for what researchers know as explanatory style. More commonly, it is found that explanatory style is distinct from dispositional optimism, so the two should not be used interchangeably as they are marginally correlated at best. More research is required to "bridge" or further differentiate these concepts.

=== Origins ===
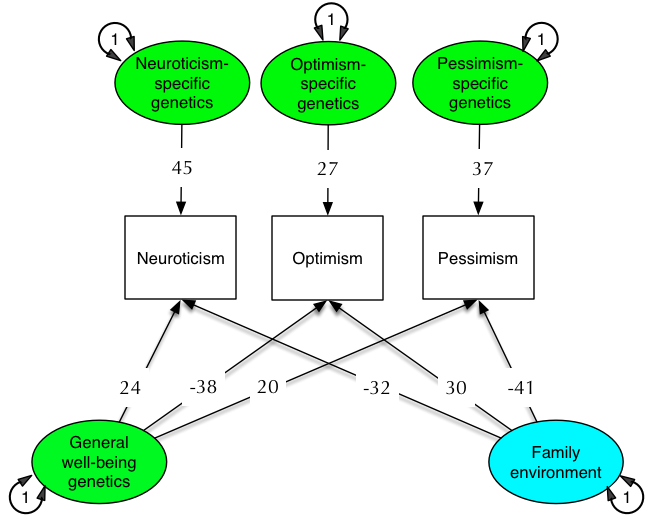
Optimistic personality (modified from)

As with all psychological traits, differences in both dispositional optimism and pessimism and in attributional style are heritable. Both optimism and pessimism are strongly influenced by environmental factors, including the family environment. Optimism may be indirectly inherited as a reflection of underlying heritable traits such as intelligence, temperament, and alcoholism. Evidence from twin studies shows that the inherited component of the dispositional optimism is about 25 percent, making this trait a stable personality dimension and a predictor of life outcomes. Its genetic origin interacts with environmental influences and other risks, to determine the vulnerability to depression across the lifespan. Many theories assume optimism can be learned, and research supports a modest role of family-environment acting to raise (or lower) optimism and lower (or raise) neuroticism and pessimism.

Work utilising brain imaging and biochemistry suggests that at a biological trait level, optimism and pessimism reflect brain systems specialised for the tasks of processing and incorporating beliefs regarding good and bad information respectively.

=== Assessment ===
==== Life Orientation Test ====
The Life Orientation Test (LOT) was designed by Scheier and Carver (1985) to assess dispositional optimism – expecting positive or negative outcomes. It is one of the more popular tests of optimism and pessimism. It was often used in early studies examining these dispositions' effects in health-related domains. Scheier and Carver's initial research, which surveyed college students, found that optimistic participants were less likely to show an increase in symptoms like dizziness, muscle soreness, fatigue, blurred vision, and other physical complaints than pessimistic respondents.

There are eight items and four filler items in the test. Four are positive items (e.g. "In uncertain times, I usually expect the best") and four are negative items e.g. "If something can go wrong for me, it will." The LOT has been revised twice—once by the original creators (LOT-R) and also by Chang, Maydeu-Olivares, and D'Zurilla as the Extended Life Orientation Test (ELOT). The Revised Life Orientation Test (LOT-R) consists of six items, each scored on a five-point scale from "Strongly disagree" to "Strongly agree" and four filler items. Half of the coded items are phrased optimistically, the other half in a pessimistic way. Compared with its previous iteration, LOT-R offers good internal consistency over time despite item overlaps, making the correlation between the LOT and LOT-R extremely high.

==== Attributional Style Questionnaire ====
The Attributional Style Questionnaire (ASQ) is based on the explanatory style model of optimism. Subjects read a list of six positive and negative events (e.g. "you have been looking for a job unsuccessfully for some time"), and are asked to record a possible cause for the event. They then rate whether this is internal or external, stable or changeable, and global or local to the event. There are several modified versions of the ASQ including the Expanded Attributional Style Questionnaire (EASQ), the Content Analysis of Verbatim Explanations (CAVE), and the ASQ designed for testing the optimism of children.

=== Associations with health ===
Optimism and health are correlated moderately. Optimism explains between 5–10% of the variation in the likelihood of developing some health conditions (correlation coefficients between .20 and .30), notably including cardiovascular disease, stroke, and depression.

The relationship between optimism and health has also been studied with regard to physical symptoms, coping strategies, and negative effects for those suffering from rheumatoid arthritis, asthma, and fibromyalgia. Among individuals with these diseases, optimists are not more likely than pessimists to report pain alleviation due to coping strategies, despite differences in psychological well-being between the two groups. A meta-analysis confirmed the assumption that optimism is related to psychological well-being: "Put simply, optimists emerge from difficult circumstances with less distress than do pessimists." Furthermore, the correlation appears to be attributable to coping style: "That is, optimists seem intent on facing problems head-on, taking active and constructive steps to solve their problems; pessimists are more likely to abandon their effort to attain their goals."

Optimists may respond better to stress: pessimists have shown higher levels of cortisol (the "stress hormone") and trouble regulating cortisol in response to stressors. Another study by Scheier examined the recovery process for a number of patients that had undergone surgery. The study showed that optimism was a strong predictor of the rate of recovery. Optimists achieved faster results in "behavioral milestones" such as sitting in bed, walking around, etc. They also were rated by staff as having a more favorable physical recovery. At a six-month follow-up, optimists were quicker to resume normal activities.

=== Optimism and well-being ===
A number of studies have been done on optimism and psychological well-being. One 30-year study undertaken by Lee et al. (2019) assessed the overall optimism and longevity of cohorts of men from the Veterans Affairs Normative Aging Study and women from the Nurses' Health Study. The study found a positive correlation between higher levels of optimism and exceptional longevity, defined as a lifespan exceeding 85 years.

Another study conducted by Aspinwall and Taylor (1990) assessed incoming freshmen on a range of personality factors such as optimism, self-esteem, locus of self-control, etc. Freshmen who scored high on optimism before entering college had lower levels of psychological distress than their more pessimistic peers while controlling for the other personality factors. Over time, the more optimistic students were less stressed, less lonely, and less depressed than their pessimistic counterparts. This study suggests a strong link between optimism and psychological well-being.

Low optimism may help explain the association between caregivers' anger and reduced sense of vitality.

A meta-analysis of optimism supported findings that optimism is positively correlated with life satisfaction, happiness, and psychological and physical well-being, and negatively correlated with depression and anxiety.

Seeking to explain the correlation, researchers find that optimists choose healthier lifestyles. For example, optimists smoke less, are more physically active, consume more fruit, vegetables, and whole-grain bread, and are more moderate in alcohol consumption.

=== Translating association into modifiability ===
Research to date has demonstrated that optimists are less likely to have certain diseases or develop certain diseases over time. Research has not yet been able to demonstrate the ability to change an individual's level of optimism through psychological interventions, and thereby perhaps alter the course of disease or likelihood for development of disease.

An article by Mayo Clinic argues that steps to change self-talk from negative to positive may shift individuals from a negative to a more positive/optimistic outlook. Strategies claimed to be of value include surrounding oneself with positive people, identifying areas of change, practicing positive self-talk, being open to humor, and following a healthy lifestyle.

There is also the notion of "learned optimism" in positive psychology, which holds that joy is a talent that can be cultivated and can be achieved through specific actions such as challenging negative self talk or overcoming "learned helplessness". However, criticism against positive psychology argues that it places too much importance on "upbeat thinking, while shunting challenging and difficult experiences to the side"—threatening to become toxic positivity.

A study involving twins found that optimism is largely inherited at birth. Along with the recognition that childhood experiences determine an individual's outlook, such studies demonstrate the genetic basis for optimism reinforces the recognized difficulty in changing or manipulating the direction of an adult's disposition from pessimist to optimist.

== Philosophical optimism ==
One of the earliest forms of philosophical optimism was Socrates' theory of moral intellectualism, which formed part of his model of enlightenment through the process of self-improvement. According to the philosopher, it is possible to live a virtuous life by attaining moral perfection through philosophical self-examination. He maintained that knowledge of moral truth is necessary and sufficient for leading a good life. In his philosophical investigations, Socrates followed a model that did not merely focus on the intellect or reason but a balanced practice that also considered emotion as an important contributor to the richness of human experience.

Distinct from a disposition to believe that things will work out, there is a philosophical idea that, perhaps in ways that may not be fully comprehended, the present moment is in an optimum state. This view that all of nature—past, present, and future—operates by laws of optimization along the lines of Hamilton's principle in the realm of physics is countered by views such as idealism, realism, and philosophical pessimism. Philosophers often link the concept of optimism with the name of Gottfried Wilhelm Leibniz, who held that we live in the best of all possible worlds (le meilleur des mondes possibles). The concept was also reflected in an aspect of Voltaire's early philosophy, one that was based on Isaac Newton's view that described a divinely ordered human condition. This philosophy would also later emerge in Alexander Pope's Essay on Man.

Leibniz proposed that it was not God's power to create a perfect world, but he created the best among possible worlds. In one of his writings, he responded to Blaise Pascal's philosophy of awe and desperation in the face of the infinite by claiming that infinity should be celebrated. While Pascal advocated for making man's rational aspirations more humble, Leibniz was optimistic about the capacity of human reason to extend itself further.

This idea was mocked by Voltaire in his satirical novel Candide as baseless optimism of the sort exemplified by the beliefs of one of its characters, Dr. Pangloss, which are the opposite of his fellow traveller Martin's pessimism and emphasis on free will. The optimistic position is also called Panglossianism which became a term for excessive, even stupendous, optimism. The phrase "panglossian pessimism" has been used to describe the pessimistic position that, since this is the best of all possible worlds, it is impossible for anything to get any better. Conversely, philosophical pessimism might be associated with an optimistic long-term view because it implies that no change for the worse is possible. Voltaire found it difficult to reconcile Leibniz's optimism with human suffering as demonstrated by the earthquake that devastated Lisbon in 1755 and the atrocities committed by the pre-revolutionary France against its people.

=== Optimalism ===
As defined by Nicholas Rescher, philosophical optimalism holds that this universe exists because it is better than the alternatives. While this philosophy does not exclude the possibility of a deity, it also does not require one, and is compatible with atheism. Rescher explained that the concept can stand on its own feet, arguing that there is no necessity to seeing optimalism realization as divinely instituted because it is a naturalistic theory in principle.

Psychological optimalism, as defined by the positive psychologist Tal Ben-Shahar, means willingness to accept failure while remaining confident that success will follow, a positive attitude he contrasts with negative perfectionism. Perfectionism can be defined as a persistent compulsive drive toward unattainable goals and valuation based solely in terms of accomplishment. Perfectionists reject the realities and constraints of human ability. They cannot accept failures, delaying any ambitious and productive behavior in fear of failing again. This neuroticism can even lead to clinical depression and low productivity. As an alternative to negative perfectionism, Ben-Shahar suggests the adoption of optimalism. Optimalism allows for failure in pursuit of a goal, and expects that while the trend of activity is towards the positive, it is not necessary always to succeed while striving towards goals. This basis in reality, prevents the optimalist from being overwhelmed in the face of failure.

Optimalists accept failures and learn from them, encouraging further pursuit of achievement. Ben-Shahar believes that optimalists and perfectionists show distinct motives. Optimalists tend to have more intrinsic, inward desires, with a motivation to learn, while perfectionists are highly motivated by a need to prove themselves worthy consistently.

Two additional facets of optimalism have been described: product optimalism and process optimalism. The former is described as an outlook that seeks to realize the best possible result, while the latter seeks maximization of the chances of achieving the best possible result.

Some sources also distinguish the concept from optimism since it does not focus on how things are going well but on whether things are going as well as possible.

== See also ==
- Affirmations (New Age) – Practice of positive thinking and self-empowerment
- Agathism – The doctrine that all things tend towards ultimate good
- Explanatory style – Psychological attribute
- Hopecore – Social media trend promoting hope and optimism
- Mood (psychology) – Relatively long lasting emotional, internal and subjective state
- Moral idealism
- New Thought – 19th-century American spiritual movement
- Optimism bias – Type of cognitive bias
- Pessimism – Negative mental attitude
- Philosophy – Study of general and fundamental questions
- Philosophy of happiness – Philosophical theory
- Pollyanna principle – Tendency to remember pleasant things better
- Positive mental attitude – Importance of positive thinking as a contributing factor of success
- Positive psychology – Approach of psychological scientific study
- Pronoia (psychology) – Phenomenon akin to the opposite of paranoia
- Self-efficacy – Psychology concept
- Silver lining (idiom) – English metaphor for optimism
- Toxic positivity – Construct in psychology
