= Relational mobility =

Sociological variable

Relational mobility is a sociological variable that represents how much freedom individuals have to choose which persons to have relationships with, including friendships, working relationships, and romantic partnerships in a given society. Societies with low relational mobility have less flexible interpersonal networks. People form relationships based on circumstance rather than active choice. In these societies, relationships are more stable and guaranteed, while there are fewer opportunities to leave unsatisfying relationships and find new ones. Group memberships tend to be fixed, and individuals have less freedom to select or change these relationships even if they wished to.

In contrast, societies with high relational mobility give people choice and freedom to select or leave interpersonal relationships based on their personal preferences. Such relationships are based on mutual agreement and are not guaranteed to last. Individuals have many opportunities to meet new people and to choose whom they interact with or which groups they belong to in such societies.

Relational mobility is conceived as a socioecological factor, which means that it depends on the social and natural environment. The theory of relational mobility has attracted increased interest since the early 2000's because it has been found to explain important cross-cultural differences in people's behavior and way of thinking.

== The relational mobility scale ==
The relational mobility scale is a sociometric scale used for measuring relational mobility in population surveys. This scale is based on a series of questions asking people not about their own situation, but the situation of people around them such as friendship groups, hobby groups, sports teams, and companies. The questions are probing to what degree these people are able to choose the people whom they interact with in their daily life, according to their own preferences.

== Geographic differences ==
Relational mobility is low in cultures with subsistence styles that put people in tight relationships with reciprocal duties such as farming that requires coordination of labor. The growing of paddy rice, in particular, requires tight coordination of labor and irrigation. The lowest level of relational mobility is found in East Asian countries where rice farming is a prevailing means of subsistence. A comparative study has found significant differences in ways of thinking between areas in China dominated by rice farming and areas dominated by wheat farming. This difference could not be explained well by other theories.

On the opposite side of the spectrum is nomadic herding. Herders move frequently, meaning that they have fewer stable, long-term relationships and more opportunities to form and break relationships. Studies have shown that herding cultures emphasize more individual decision making while nearby farming and fishing cultures emphasize harmonious social interdependence and holistic thinking.

A large cross-cultural study has found that relational mobility is lowest in East Asian countries where rice farming is common. The relational mobility is higher in industrialized European countries and English-speaking countries, while it is highest in South American countries. This study found a strong correlation between relational mobility and subsistence style, and a somewhat weaker correlation with environmental threats that require group cohesion and cooperation.

== Consequences for people's behavior and way of thinking ==
People in cultures with low relational mobility are careful to avoid conflicts and disagreements in order to maintain harmony in the social groups that they cannot escape. They are careful not to offend others in order to avoid a bad reputation. Thus, the cultural preference for conformity, which is common in East Asian cultures, is actually a strategy to avoid bad reputation and social exclusion. People in these cultures are more sensitive to social rejection and more likely to feel ashamed towards their friends (but not towards strangers) in order to mitigate information that may damage their reputation.

The degree of relational mobility is influencing people's way of thinking. A low relational mobility is leading to cognitive tendencies that theorists call holistic thinking, while high relational mobility is associated with analytic thinking. This difference in social cognition is defined as a difference in how people attribute their own and others’ behavior to either internal causes (the actors’ dispositions) or external causes (situational factors). Individuals’ need to coordinate their actions and avoid conflict makes salient the influence of external forces, including powerful others in the environment, on their own situation. An external locus of control is typical of cultures with low relational mobility. People pay more attention to situational factors and to chance, fate, and luck than to individual dispositions in these cultures. In contrast, high relational mobility is associated with an internal locus of control with more focus on the individual and less focus on the social environment.

Social relationships and group memberships are more easily formed and terminated in cultures with high relational mobility. Interpersonal connections are here based on mutual convenience and thus less stable and reliable. Less importance is placed on job security, while also divorce is more common and more accepted. People invest more effort in attracting, forming, and maintaining social bonds where relationships cannot be taken for granted. People exhibit more self-enhancement behavior and higher self-esteem here in order to advertise their value as companions and to facilitate the forming of social bonds. People are more prone to develop personal uniqueness in high relational mobility societies in order to increase their value in the market-like competition for social relationships. Idiosyncratic behavior is less common in low relational mobility societies where it may lead to ostracism.

People tend to invest more in maintaining friendships as well as romantic partnerships where relational mobility is high, because the stability of the bond cannot be taken for granted. This bonding behavior includes helping, intimacy, passion, and gift-giving. People even disclose personal information to friends in order to show their commitment to the relationship. There is also evidence that people report more happiness in cultures with more relational mobility, even comparing regions within the same country.

There are different ways of dealing with uncertainty about the quality of a potential partner or collaborator. In low relational mobility societies such as Japan, firms often maintain long-term relations with loyal partners even if better deals with new partners could be obtained. Business strategies tend to be different in societies with higher relational mobility, such as North America, where new relationships are formed based on trust. There is higher risk in new business relationships, but also more to gain by finding a potentially better business partner than one already has. In general, the level of interpersonal trust has been found to be higher in societies with high relational mobility, not only in business relations, but also in general interpersonal relations and on social media.

== Consequences for societies ==
Researchers have found evidence that cultures with higher relational mobility had higher rates of COVID-19 infections and death per capita. The theory is that cultures with higher relational mobility have more interactions in broad social networks and with new people, and these interactions give the virus more opportunities to spread. Cultural differences in relational mobility predicted more infections and death, even controlling for differences in economic development, international trade, population density, the prevalence of COVID-19 testing, and other variables. There is some evidence that relational mobility was particularly important in the first few months of the pandemic, but it became less important over time, perhaps because cultures shut down public venues, and people changed their socialization patterns.

However, there seem to be exceptions to this pattern. For example, cultures with low relational mobility may have stronger expectations of seeing family and friends for important holidays. This could explain why a study in China found that rice-farming areas had rates of COVID-19 infections that were three times higher than wheat-farming areas at the beginning of the outbreak in 2020, which coincided with Chinese New Year. People in rice-farming areas of China reported visiting more family and friends than people in wheat-farming areas of China for Chinese New Year. In contrast, people in cultures of high relational mobility may give people more flexibility to choose whether or not to see people for holidays.

== Animal analogies ==
The theory of relational mobility has analogies in the mating behavior, cooperation behavior, and inter-species symbiosis among animals. It has been observed that such behavior is adjusted to the stability of the relationships, the degree of competition on the relationship "market", and the possibilities for cheating among a variety of species, including birds and insects.

== See also ==
- Costly signaling theory in evolutionary psychology
- Cross-cultural psychology
- Cross-cultural studies
- Cultural psychology
- East Asian cultural sphere
- Locus of control
- Long-term vs, Short-term orientation
- Socioecology
- Socio-ecological system
