= Culture and social cognition =

Term in psychology

Culture and social cognition is the relationship between human culture and human cognitive capabilities. Cultural cognitive evolution proposes that humans' unique cognitive capacities are not solely due to biological inheritance, but are in fact due in large part to cultural transmission and evolution (Tomasello, 1999). Modern humans and great apes are separated evolutionarily by about six million years. Proponents of cultural evolution argue that this would not have been enough time for humans to develop the advanced cognitive capabilities required to create tools, language, and build societies through biological evolution. Biological evolution could not have individually produced each of these cognitive capabilities within that period of time. Instead, humans must have evolved the capacity to learn through cultural transmission (Tomasello, 1999). This provides a more plausible explanation that would fit within the given time frame. Instead of having to biologically account for each cognitive mechanism that distinguishes modern humans from previous relatives, one would only have to account for one significant biological adaptation for cultural learning. According to this view, the ability to learn through cultural transmission is what distinguishes humans from other primates (Tomasello, 1999). Cultural learning allows humans to build on existing knowledge and make collective advancements, also known as the "ratchet effect". The ratchet effect simply refers to the way in which humans continuously add on to existing knowledge through modifications and improvements. This unique ability distinguishes humans from related primates, who do not seem to build collaborative knowledge over time. Instead, primates seem to build individual knowledge, in which the expertise of one animal is not built on by others, and does not progress across time.

== Cultural learning & Acculturation ==
Cultural learning can be defined as how individuals learn and educate themselves about information, process the information, and then pass on the information one has learned. The cultural transmission of humans involves imitation learning, instructional learning, and collaborative learning. Each can be defined as follows:

- Imitation Learning: Learning about information via the observation of others and copying them.
- Instructional Learning: Learning about information by being directly taught by others.
- Collaborative Learning: Learning information through the cooperation of other individuals.

The social cognition humans have allows culture and traditions to be passed on to the next generation. Children are highly impressionable, and their personalities not only enable them to learn, but as well as the environment they are in. Whether a child or individual is raised in a collectivist or individualistic culture does not change this as well when comparing cultures from western and eastern cultures. There still is a universal learning process humans and animals have that allows the transmission of information to be passed on to later generations, it is however just flexible enough to accommodate all cultures. Cultural learning, specifically, is dependent on the innovation of the creation of new behaviors in different environments and how that behavior is able to be imitated or communicated by other individuals.

The term acculturation also falls under cultural learning where it is defined as when a minority culture within a different society adapts itself to the majority culture, but still retains its own unique features, customs, practices, and beliefs. However, while acculturation does occur, there is no empirical research that at an individual level from an immigrant minority group will completely alter their own culture and customs as a result of the cultural learning they are observing from the majority culture. The culture of an immigrant from another society to a new society will vary in different degrees based on an individual's attitudes to the majority culture and the one they came from.

== Social Cognition in Mammals and Primates ==
Primates show distinct characteristics of social cognition in comparison to mammals. Mammals are able to identify members of their species, understand basic kinships and basic social hierarchies, make predictions about others' behavior based on emotion and movement, and engage in social learning (Tomasello, 1999). Primates, however, show a more extensive understanding of these concepts. Primates not only understand kinship and social hierarchies, but they also have an understanding of relational categories. That is, primates are able to understand social relations that extend beyond their individual interaction with others. Mammals are able to form direct relationships based on social hierarchies, but primates have an understanding of social hierarchies and relationships that extend beyond them personally. Researchers believe that this understanding of relational categories might have been the evolutionary precursor to humans' deeper understanding of desires, beliefs, and goals underlying causal relationships, and thereby allowing humans to relate to and understand other individuals, making way for cultural evolution (Tomasello, 1999).

Although it is now believed that non-human primates such as chimpanzees have some limited understanding of others as intentional beings, it is clear that these understanding are not as deep as human understanding of others as intentional agents. Chimpanzees, for example, demonstrated an ability to think about what others see, and predict behavior based on these beliefs in several studies conducted by Tomasello and Hare (2003). For example, subordinate chimpanzees in one experiment avoided food that they knew the dominant chimpanzee could see, but sought food that the dominant chimpanzee could not see due to a physical barrier. In another experiment, subordinate chimpanzees made decisions about approaching food based on whether or not the dominant chimpanzee had seen the human researcher place the food behind the barrier. Chimpanzees were also found to react differently to humans who were unwilling versus unable to provide food (teasing the chimpanzee with food, or pretending to have an accident with it), thereby showing some ability to discriminate intentionality.

Dogs have also shown some interesting but limited abilities at social cognition in a series of studies by Hare and Tomasello (2005). Dogs have the ability to read human social cues, even to a greater extent than chimpanzees. Dogs are able to respond to human pointing, the human gaze, and subtle human nods without training. Researchers now believe that these abilities are the result of convergent evolution between humans and dogs through domestication. Research with domesticated foxes has shown that the likely mechanism for this convergent evolution was the selection of tame behavior in dogs. This finding suggests that perhaps humans had to evolve a propensity to cooperate before cultural evolution was able to take place (Hare & Tomasello, 2005).

== Sociogenesis & Human Ontogeny ==
Sociogenesis refers to collaborative inventiveness. It is the process by which two or more humans collectively interact and invent something new which could not have been developed by one individual alone, such as language and mathematics (Tomasello, 1999). Sociogenesis can occur across time, or simultaneously (Tomasello, 1999). Sociogenesis across times occurs through the ratchet effect, when one individual modifies something they had previously learned through others. Over time, ideas, tools, and language advance. Simultaneous sociogenesis occurs when two or more individuals work together at the same time and develop something new.

In response to the nature versus nurture and learned versus innate debate, proponents of cultural evolution argue that cognitive psychology must take into account historical processes when studying and discussion cognition (Tomasello, 1999). For example, the similarities between languages have led many researchers to decry that language or aspects of language must be innate. The extreme variability in math and counting systems across cultures has prevented similar conclusions for math. However, Tomasello argues that if you look at these concepts with historical processes in mind, another plausible explanation could be that language, but not math, developed before people split into different populations. Math developed only after such split, and because the cultural needs of these people differed, differential counting and mathematical systems resulted. The critique is that categorizing concepts as innate or learned does not tell us anything about the process by which they originally developed.
