= My Silver Lining =

My Silver Lining may refer to:

- "My Silver Lining" (First Aid Kit song), 2014
- "My Silver Lining" (Mickey Gilley song), 1979
