= Is the glass half empty or half full? =

Common expression regarding optimism or pessimism

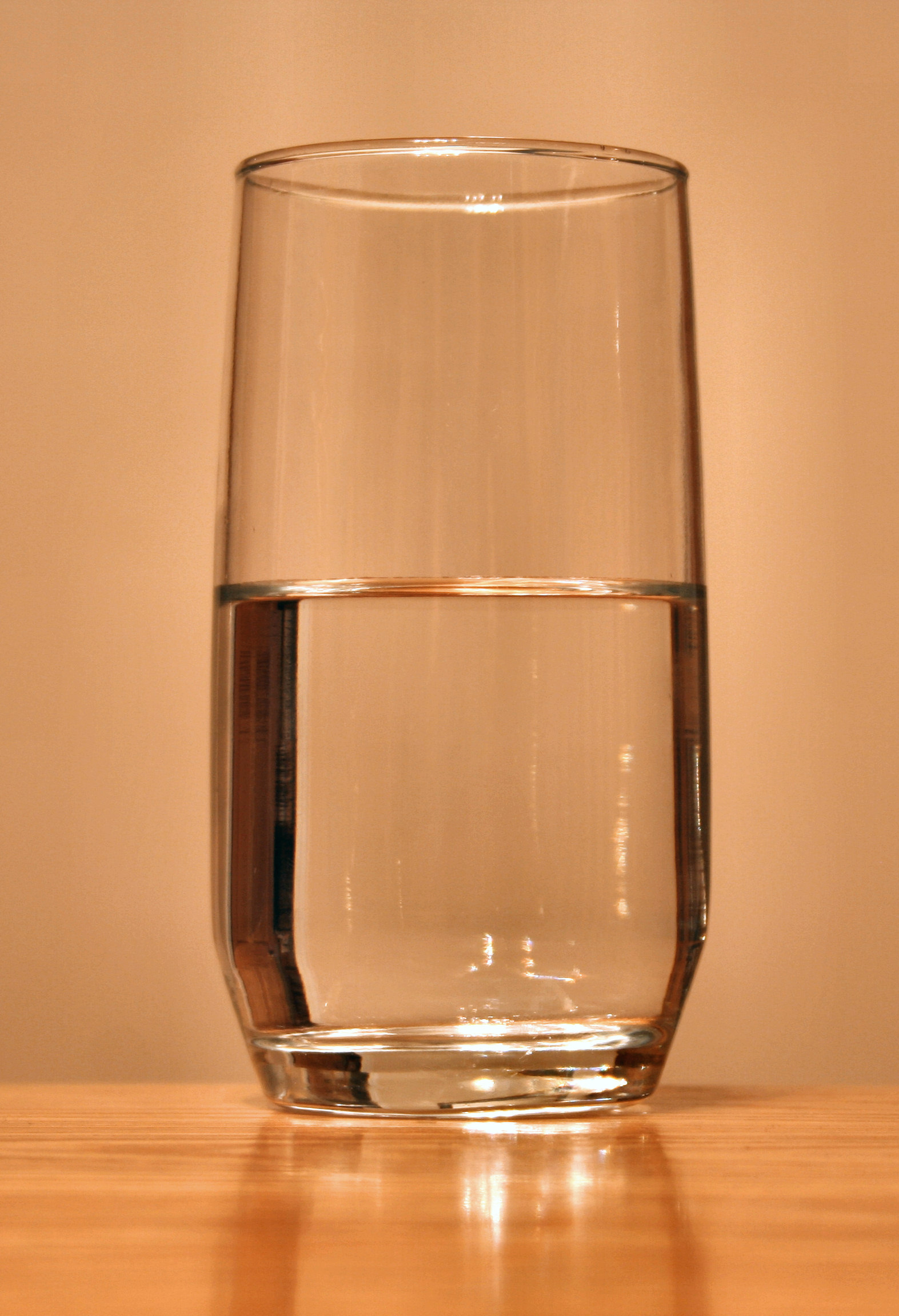
To illustrate this figuratively: Is this glass half empty or half full?

"Is the glass half empty or half full?", and other similar expressions such as the adjectives glass-half-full or glass-half-empty, are idioms which contrast an optimistic and pessimistic outlook on a specific situation or on the world at large. "Half full" means optimistic and "half empty" means pessimistic. The origins of this idea are unclear, but it dates at least to the early 20th century. Josiah Stamp is often given credit for introducing it in a 1935 speech, but although he did help to popularize it, a variant regarding a car's gas tank occurs in print with the optimism/pessimism connotations as early as 1929, and the glass-with-water version is mentioned simply as an intellectual paradox about the quantity of water (without reference to optimism/pessimism) as early as 1908. This can also be taken as a false dilemma because both descriptions can be and are simultaneously true.

== See also ==
- Cooperative principle
- Cognitive bias in animals
- Framing effects (psychology)
- Framing (social sciences)
- Less-is-better effect
- List of cognitive biases
- Silver lining (idiom)
