= Learned optimism =

Concept in positive psychology

Learned optimism is the idea in positive psychology that a talent for joy, like any other, can be cultivated. In contrast with learned helplessness, optimism is learned by consciously challenging negative self talk.

== Overview ==
Learned optimism was described by Martin Seligman and published in his 1990 book, Learned Optimism. The benefits of an optimistic outlook are many. For example, optimists tend to be higher achievers and have better overall health. Pessimism, on the other hand, is much more common; pessimists are more likely to give up in the face of adversity and to have depression. Seligman invites pessimists to learn to be optimists by thinking about their reactions to adversity in a new way. The resulting optimism—one that grew from pessimism—is a learned optimism. The optimist's outlook on failure can thus be summarized as "What happened was an unlucky situation (not personal), and really just a setback (not permanent) for this one, of many, goals (not pervasive)".

The differences between pessimists and optimists can be understood in terms of explanatory style:

- Permanence: Optimistic people believe bad events to be temporary happenings rather than permanent failures, and thus bounce back quickly from them, whereas others may take longer periods to recover or may never recover. They also believe good things happen for long-lasting, reasoned causes, rather than assuming positive events to only occur because of temporary happenstance. Optimists point to specific temporary causes for negative events; pessimists point to permanent causes.
- Pervasiveness: Optimistic people compartmentalize helplessness, whereas pessimistic people assume that failure in one area of life means failure in life as a whole. Optimistic people also allow good events to brighten every area of their lives rather than just the particular area in which the event occurred.
- Personalization: Optimists blame bad events on causes outside of themselves, whereas pessimists blame themselves for events that occur. Optimists are therefore generally more confident. Optimists also quickly internalize positive events while pessimists externalize them.

== History ==
Seligman came to the concept of learned optimism through a scientific study of learned helplessness in the 1960s and 1970s. Learned helplessness arises from a certain recurring negative event that is out of the person's control. As he was performing tests to study helplessness further, Seligman began to wonder why some people resisted helplessness-conditioning. He noticed that, while some subjects blamed themselves for negative outcomes, others blamed the experiment for setting them up to fail.

Seligman shifted his focus to attempting to discover what it is that keeps some people from ever becoming helpless. The answer was optimism. Using his knowledge about conditioning people to be helpless in the lab, he shifted his focus to conditioning people to be optimists. The result of these experiments led to defining the processes of learning optimism.

== Research ==
In a study completed by Martin Seligman and Gregory Buchanan at the University of Pennsylvania and published by the American Psychological Association, learned optimism techniques were found to significantly reduce depression in a class of college freshmen. As incoming students to the university, a survey determined the most pessimistic students and they were invited to participate in the study. They were randomly assigned, half to attend a 16-hour workshop on the techniques of learning optimism, and half were the control group. In an 18-month follow up, 32% of the control group suffered moderate to severe depression and 15% suffered moderate to severe anxiety disorder, whereas only 22% of the workshop participants were depressed and 7% had anxiety issues. Those who participated in the learned optimism workshop also reported fewer health problems over the 18-month period of the study than those students in the control group.

A study done by Peter Schulman at the Wharton School, published in the Journal of Selling and Sales Management, looked to determine the effects of applying learned optimism in business. After measuring the optimism levels of an insurance sales force, it was determined that the optimistic sales people sold 35 percent more, and identified pessimists were two times more likely to quit in the first year than optimists. As a result of his studies, he recommends testing sales job candidates for optimism levels to fit them to appropriate positions, training employees in learned optimism techniques, and designing an organization overall to have attainable goals set and good support from management.

Finally, a study conducted by Mark Ylvisaker of the College of Saint Rose and Timothy Feeney of the Wildwood Institute looked at children with executive function impairment. The children had brain functioning impairments affecting motor skills, memory, or the ability to focus. Learned optimism was not taught to the children themselves, but rather to their caretakers, who often are more likely to feel helpless than optimistic in regards to caring for the child. It was found that learned optimism in caretakers of children with brain damage actually led the children to develop more functioning than children without optimistic caretakers. Thus Ylvisaker concludes that the optimism of professional rehabilitators can affect the results of their clients.

=== Seligman's method of learning optimism ===
According to Martin Seligman, anyone can learn optimism. Whether currently an optimist or a pessimist, benefits can be gained from exposure to the process of learned optimism to improve response to both big and small adversities. A learned optimism test (developed by Seligman) is used to determine an individual's base level of optimism. Being in the more pessimistic categories means that learning optimism has a chance of preventing depression, helping the person achieve more, and improve physical health.

Seligman's process of learning optimism consists of a simple method to train a new way of responding to adversity, specifically, by learning to talk themselves through personal defeat. It begins with the Ellis ABC model of adversity, belief, and consequence. Adversity is the event that happens, Belief is how that adversity is interpreted, and Consequences are the feelings and actions that result from the beliefs. This is demonstrated in the example below:

- Adversity: Someone cuts you off in traffic.
- Belief: You think, "I can't believe that idiot was so rude and selfish!"
- Consequence: You are overcome with anger, yelling profanity at the other driver.

In the journey to learning optimism, emphasis is placed on first understanding one's current reaction to and interpretation of adversity. Learners are asked to keep a journal for two days in which they note small adverse events and the beliefs and consequences that followed. Next the learner returns to the journal to highlight pessimism (e.g., pervasiveness: "it doomed me...") in their written descriptions of the events.

To the ABC model, Seligman adds "D" (disputation) and E (energization). Disputation centers on generating counter-evidence to any of the following: the negative beliefs in general, the causes of the event, or the implications. D also means reminding oneself of any potential usefulness of moving on from the adversity. Disputation for the above traffic example might sound like this: "I am overreacting. I don't know what situation he is in. Maybe he is on his way to his daughter's piano recital and is running late. I'm sure I have cut people off before without meaning to, so I should really cut him a break. I am not in a hurry anyway."

Over time, responses like this are predicted to change feelings to be more hopeful and positive. Successful disputation leads to energization, the E in the ABCDE model. One is energized, and should indeed try to actively celebrate, the positive feelings and sense of accomplishment that come from successful disputation of negative beliefs. Disputation and Energization (celebration) are the keys to Seligman's method.

Teaching children learned optimism by guiding them through the ABCDE techniques can help children to better deal with adversity they encounter in their lives. If children are taught early then the thought process of disputation is claimed to become ingrained in them. They do not, then, have to focus on being optimistic, but rather optimism becomes automatic and leads to a more positive life for the child.

== Applications ==
If learnable, optimism techniques could be practical in life. They are used today in many areas such as parenting, business, therapy, and education.

Business would benefit from more optimistic workers, as they are more successful. Seligman's focus in business is on "the personal wall" that is each individual worker's set-point of discouragement. Putting the ABCDE model into practice attempts to allow workers to respond to this "wall" with a readiness to conquer rather than to feel dejected. The Attributional Style Questionnaire is often used to measure optimism of job candidates during the interview process by asking the participant to write down causes for situational failures. Participants attributions may be used to help understand if the candidate will be a high or low performer in his/her projected role based on his level of optimism.

Learned optimism has been used to combat depression during cognitive behavioral therapy. This is based on the idea that patients may be depressed in part because they have a pessimistic outlook. Rather than perceiving adversity as a constant thing that cannot be overcome, and taking personal blame for that adversity, patients come out of cognitive behavioral therapy with the belief that they can control how they respond to adversity. A shift toward optimism is a shift away from depression.

== See also ==
- Learned optimism (Wikiversity)
- Optimism
