= Pessimism =

Negative mental attitude

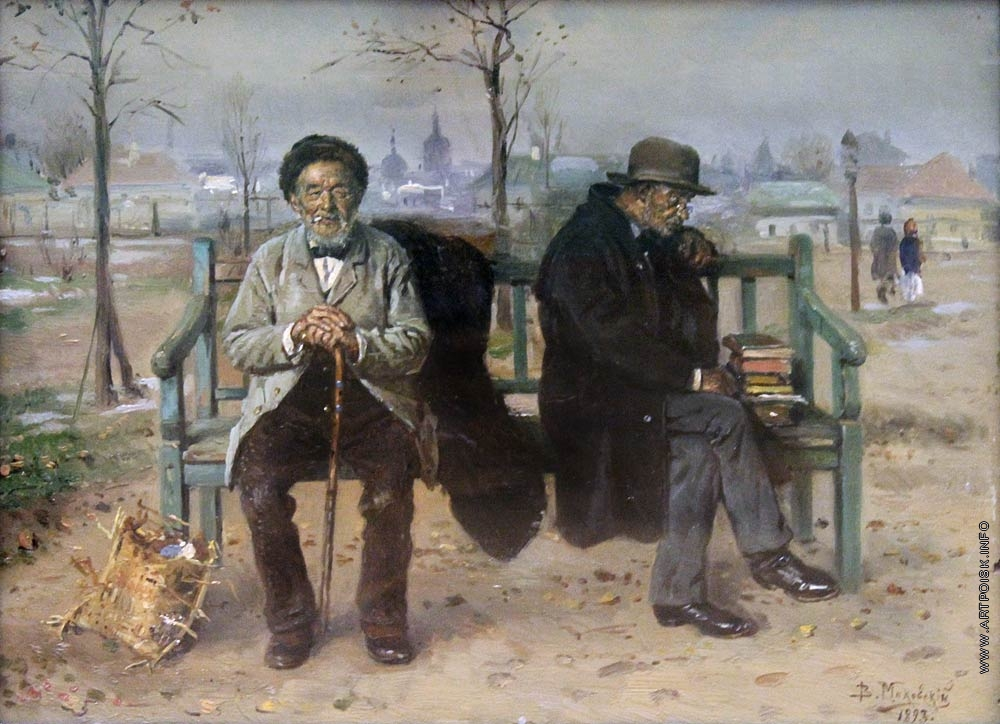
An optimist and a pessimist, Vladimir Makovsky, 1893

Pessimism is the mental attitude of expecting upsetting or undesirable outcomes. Pessimists tend to focus on the negatives of life in general. A common question asked to test for pessimism is "Is the glass half empty or half full?"; in this situation, a pessimist is said to see the glass as half empty, or in extreme cases completely empty, while an optimist is said to see the glass as half full. Throughout history, the pessimistic disposition has had effects on all major areas of thinking.

== Etymology ==
The term pessimism derives from the Latin word pessimus, meaning 'the worst'. It was first used by Jesuit critics of Voltaire's 1759 novel Candide, ou l'Optimisme. Voltaire was satirizing the philosophy of Leibniz who maintained that this was the 'best (optimum) of all possible worlds'. In their attacks on Voltaire, the Jesuits of the Revue de Trévoux accused him of pessimisme.

== As a psychological disposition ==
In the ancient world, psychological pessimism was associated with melancholy, and was believed to be caused by an excess of black bile in the body. The study of pessimism has parallels with the study of depression. Psychologists trace pessimistic attitudes to emotional pain or even biology. Aaron Beck argues that depression is due to unrealistic negative views about the world. Beck starts treatment by engaging in conversation with clients about their unhelpful thoughts. Pessimists, however, are often able to provide arguments that suggest that their understanding of reality is justified; as in Depressive realism or (pessimistic realism). Deflection is a common method used by those who are depressed. They let people assume they are revealing everything which proves to be an effective way of hiding. The pessimism item on the Beck Depression Inventory has been judged useful in predicting suicides. The Beck Hopelessness Scale has also been described as a measurement of pessimism.

Wender and Klein point out that pessimism can be useful in some circumstances: "If one is subject to a series of defeats, it pays to adopt a conservative game plan of sitting back and waiting and letting others take the risks. Such waiting would be fostered by a pessimistic outlook. Similarly if one is raking in the chips of life, it pays to adopt an expansive risk-taking approach, and thus maximize access to scarce resources."

The leading causes of pessimism are genetics, past experience, and social and environmental factors. One study of 5,187 teenage twins and their siblings suggests that genetics may account for one-third of the variance in whether someone leans toward pessimism vs. optimism, with the remaining variance due to their environment, and twin studies suggest that, when it comes to personality, about half the differences between us are because of genetic factors. But Spector points out that throughout our lives, in response to environmental factors, our genes are constantly being dialled up and down as with a dimmer switch, a process known as epigenetics.

== Criticism ==
=== Pragmatic criticism ===
Through history, some have concluded that a pessimistic attitude, although justified, must be avoided to endure. Optimistic attitudes are favored and of emotional consideration. Al-Ghazali and William James rejected their pessimism after suffering psychological, or even psychosomatic illness. Criticisms of this sort however assume that pessimism leads inevitably to a mood of darkness and utter depression. Many philosophers would disagree, claiming that the term "pessimism" is being abused. The link between pessimism and nihilism is present, but the former does not necessarily lead to the latter, as philosophers such as Albert Camus believed. Happiness is not inextricably linked to optimism, nor is pessimism inextricably linked to unhappiness. One could easily imagine an unhappy optimist, and a happy pessimist. Accusations of pessimism may be used to silence legitimate criticism.

Nouriel Roubini, an economist who introduces himself as Dr. Doom, was largely dismissed as a pessimist in 2006 for his dire but to some extent accurate predictions of a financial crisis, ahead of the 2008 financial crisis. However, financial journalist Justin Fox observed in the Harvard Business Review in 2010 that the crisis Roubini predicted was not at all like the 2008 financial crisis; it involved a currency crisis and run on the dollar and dismissed Roubini's predictions as inaccurate. Others noted that "The problem is that even though he was spectacularly right on this one, he went on to predict time and time again, as the markets and the economy recovered in the years following the collapse, that there would be a follow-up crisis and that more extreme crashes were inevitable. His calls, after his initial pronouncement, were consistently wrong. Indeed, if you had listened to him, and many investors did, you would have missed the longest bull market run in US market history." Another observed: "For a prophet, he's wrong an awful lot of the time." Tony Robbins wrote: "Roubini warned of a recession in 2004 (wrongly), 2005 (wrongly), 2006 (wrongly), and 2007 (wrongly)" ... and he "predicted (wrongly) that there'd be a 'significant' stock market correction in 2013." Speaking about Roubini, economist Anirvan Banerji told The New York Times: "Even a stopped clock is right twice a day." Economist Nariman Behravesh said: "Nouriel Roubini has been singing the doom-and-gloom story for 10 years. Eventually something was going to be right."

Personality Plus opines that pessimistic temperaments (e.g., melancholy and phlegmatic) can be useful inasmuch as pessimists' focus on the negative helps them spot problems that people with more optimistic temperaments (e.g., choleric and sanguine) miss.

== Other forms of pessimism ==
=== Philosophical pessimism ===
Philosophical pessimism is not a state of mind or a psychological disposition, but rather it is a worldview or philosophical position that assigns a negative value to life or existence. Philosophical pessimists commonly argue that the world contains an empirical prevalence of pains over pleasures, that existence is ontologically or metaphysically adverse to living beings, and that life is fundamentally meaningless or without purpose.

=== Political and cultural ===
Philosophical pessimism stands opposed to the optimism or even utopianism of Hegelian philosophies. Emil Cioran claimed "Hegel is chiefly responsible for modern optimism. How could he have failed to see that consciousness changes only its forms and modalities, but never progresses?" Philosophical pessimism is differentiated from other political philosophies by having no ideal governmental structure or political project, rather pessimism generally tends to be an anti-systematic philosophy of individual action. This is because philosophical pessimists tend to be skeptical that any politics of social progress can actually improve the human condition. As Cioran states, "every step forward is followed by a step back: this is the unfruitful oscillation of history". Cioran also attacks political optimism because it creates an "idolatry of tomorrow" which can be used to authorize anything in its name. This does not mean however, that the pessimist cannot be politically involved, as Camus argued in The Rebel (1951). Pessimism about the human condition was also expressed by Hobbes (1588–1679).

There is another strain of thought generally associated with a pessimistic worldview, this is the pessimism of cultural criticism and social decline. Anthony Trollope summarised the attitude with gentle mockery in 1880: "Everything is going wrong. [...] Farmers are generally on the verge of ruin. Trade is always bad. The Church is in danger. The House of Lords isn't worth a dozen years' purchase. The throne totters."

Oswald Spengler's The Decline of the West (1918–1922) popularised pessimism. Spengler promoted a cyclic model of history similar to the theories of Giambattista Vico (1668–1744). Spengler believed that modern western civilization was in a "winter" age of decline (German: Untergang). Spenglerian theory was immensely influential in interwar Europe, especially in Weimar Germany. Similarly, traditionalist Julius Evola (1898–1974) thought that the world was in the Kali Yuga, a Dark Age of moral decline.

Intellectuals such as Oliver James correlate economic progress with economic inequality, the stimulation of artificial needs, and affluenza. Anti-consumerists identify rising trends of conspicuous consumption and self-interested, image-conscious behavior in culture. Post-modernists like Jean Baudrillard (1929–2007) have even argued that culture (and therefore our lives) now has no basis in reality whatsoever.

Conservative thinkers, especially social conservatives, often perceive politics in a generally pessimistic way. William F. Buckley famously remarked that he was "standing athwart history yelling 'stop!'", and Whittaker Chambers (1901-1961) was convinced that capitalism was bound to fall to communism, though he himself became staunchly anti-communist. Social conservatives often see the West as a decadent and nihilistic civilization which has abandoned its roots in Christianity and/or Greek philosophy, leaving it doomed to fall into moral and political decay. Robert Bork's Slouching Toward Gomorrah and Allan Bloom's The Closing of the American Mind are famous expressions of this point of view.

Many economic conservatives and libertarians believe that the expansion of the state and the role of government in society is inevitable, and that they are at best fighting a holding action against it. They hold that the natural tendency of people is to be ruled and that freedom is an exceptional state of affairs which is now being abandoned in favor of social and economic security provided by the welfare state. Political pessimism has sometimes found expression in dystopian novels such as George Orwell's Nineteen Eighty-Four. Political pessimism about one's country often correlates with a desire to emigrate.

During the 2008 financial crisis in the United States, the neologism "pessimism porn" came to describe the alleged eschatological and survivalist thrill some people derive from predicting, reading, and fantasizing about the collapse of civil society through the destruction of the world's economic system.

Puolanka, a municipality located in the Kainuu region in the northern Finland, has been called the "most pessimistic municipality in Finland", and in 2019, the municipality gained worldwide publicity when the BBC published a video about Puolanka, describing it as the "most pessimistic town in the world". Pessimism has a long tradition in the Kainuu region, mostly because Kainuu was a poor region that had often suffered from famines in the late 19th century and early 20th century, which is why the region is also called a "hunger land".

=== Technological and environmental ===
Technological pessimism is the belief that advances in science and technology do not lead to an improvement in the human condition. Technological pessimism can be said to have originated during the Industrial Revolution with the Luddite movement. Luddites blamed the rise of industrial mills and advanced factory machinery for the loss of their jobs and set out to destroy them. The Romantic movement was also pessimistic towards the rise of technology and longed for simpler and more natural times. Poets like William Wordsworth and William Blake believed that industrialization was polluting the purity of nature.

Some social critics and environmentalists believe that globalization, overpopulation and the economic practices of modern capitalist states over-stress the planet's ecological equilibrium. They warn that unless something is done to slow this, climate change will worsen eventually leading to some form of social and ecological collapse. James Lovelock believes that the ecology of the Earth has already been irretrievably damaged, and even an unrealistic shift in politics would not be enough to save it. According to Lovelock, the Earth's climate regulation system is being overwhelmed by pollution and the Earth will soon jump from its current state into a dramatically hotter climate. Lovelock blames this state of affairs on what he calls "polyanthroponemia", which is when: "humans overpopulate until they do more harm than good." Lovelock states:

The presence of 7 billion people aiming for first-world comforts…is clearly incompatible with the homeostasis of climate but also with chemistry, biological diversity and the economy of the system.

Some radical environmentalists, anti-globalization activists, and Neo-luddites can be said to hold to this type of pessimism about the effects of modern "progress". A more radical form of environmental pessimism is anarcho-primitivism which faults the agricultural revolution with giving rise to social stratification, coercion, and alienation. Some anarcho-primitivists promote deindustrialization, abandonment of modern technology and rewilding.

An infamous anarcho-primitivist is Theodore Kaczynski, also known as the Unabomber, who engaged in a nationwide mail bombing campaign. In his 1995 Unabomber Manifesto, he called attention to the erosion of human freedom by the rise of the modern "industrial-technological system". The manifesto begins thus:

The Industrial Revolution and its consequences have been a disaster for the human race. They have greatly increased the life-expectancy of those of us who live in "advanced" countries, but they have destabilized society, have made life unfulfilling, have subjected human beings to indignities, have led to widespread psychological suffering (in the Third World to physical suffering as well) and have inflicted severe damage on the natural world. The continued development of technology will worsen the situation. It will certainly subject human beings to greater indignities and inflict greater damage on the natural world, it will probably lead to greater social disruption and psychological suffering, and it may lead to increased physical suffering even in "advanced" countries.

One of the most radical pessimist organizations is the voluntary human extinction movement, which argues for the extinction of the human race through antinatalism.

Pope Francis' controversial 2015 encyclical on ecological issues is rife with pessimistic assessments of the role of technology in the modern world.

=== Entropy pessimism ===
Natural resources flow through the economy and end up as waste and pollution.

"Entropy pessimism" represents a special case of technological and environmental pessimism, based on thermodynamic principles. According to the first law of thermodynamics, matter and energy is neither created nor destroyed in the economy. According to the second law of thermodynamics—also known as the entropy law—what happens in the economy is that all matter and energy is transformed from states available for human purposes (valuable natural resources) to states unavailable for human purposes (valueless waste and pollution). In effect, all of man's technologies and activities are only speeding up the general march against a future planetary "heat death" of degraded energy, exhausted natural resources and a deteriorated environment—a state of maximum entropy locally on earth; "locally" on earth, that is, when compared to the heat death of the universe, taken as a whole.

The term "entropy pessimism" was coined to describe the work of Romanian American economist Nicholas Georgescu-Roegen, a progenitor in economics and the paradigm founder of ecological economics. Georgescu-Roegen made extensive use of the entropy concept in his magnum opus on The Entropy Law and the Economic Process. Since the 1990s, leading ecological economist and steady-state theorist Herman Daly—a student of Georgescu-Roegen—had been the economic profession's most influential proponent of entropy pessimism prior to his death in 2022.

Among other matters, the entropy pessimism position is concerned with the existential impossibility of allocating Earth's finite stock of mineral resources evenly among an unknown number of present and future generations. This number of generations is likely to remain unknown to us, as there is no way—or only little way—of knowing in advance if or when humankind will ultimately face extinction. In effect, any conceivable intertemporal allocation of the stock may inevitably end up with universal economic decline at some future point.

Entropy pessimism is a widespread view in ecological economics and in the degrowth movement.

=== Legal ===
Bibas writes that some criminal defense attorneys prefer to err on the side of pessimism: "Optimistic forecasts risk being proven disastrously wrong at trial, an embarrassing result that makes clients angry. On the other hand, if clients plead based on their lawyers' overly pessimistic advice, the cases do not go to trial and the clients are none the wiser."

== See also ==
- Cynicism
- Declinism
- Defeatism
- Defensive pessimism
- Depressive realism
- The Devil's Dictionary
- Depression (mood)
- Doomerism
- Dystopia
- Fatalism
- Mood
- Murphy's law
- Neuroticism
- Nihilism
- Optimism
- Optimism bias
- Paranoia
- Toxic positivity
- Whig history
