= The old man lost his horse =

Ancient Chinese proverb

The old man lost his horse (but it all turned out for the best) (Chinese: 塞翁失馬，焉知非福; lit. 'The old man of the frontier lost his horse', 'how could he know if this is not fortuitous?'), also known as Bad luck? Good luck? Who knows? or Bad luck brings good luck, and good luck brings bad luck is considered one of the most famous parables from the Huainanzi (淮南子; 'Master of Huainan'), chapter 18 (人間訓; Rénjiānxùn; 'In the World of Man'), dating back to 2nd century B.C. The story exemplifies the Taoist view regarding "fortune" ("good luck") and "misfortune" ("bad luck").

The story is well-known throughout the East Asian cultural sphere and is often invoked to express the idea of a "silver lining" or "blessing in disguise". It is most commonly written, read, and spoken in Chinese, Vietnamese, Korean, and Japanese.

In Western literature the parable was modified and is frequently used in philosophical or religious texts, or in books dealing with management or psychological strategies.

== Translation ==
塞翁失馬

夫禍富之 轉而相生，
其變難見也。
近塞上之人有善術者。
馬無故亡而入胡。
人皆弔之。
其父曰：
“此何遽不為福乎？”
居數月，
其馬將胡駿馬而歸。
人皆賀之。
其父曰：
“此何遽不能為禍乎？”
家富良馬，
其子好騎，
墮而折其髀。
人皆弔之。
其父曰：
“此何遽不為福乎？”
居一年，
胡人大入塞，
丁壯者引弦而戰，
近塞之人，死者十九，
此獨以跛之故。
父子相保。
故福之為禍，
禍之為福。
化不可極
深不可測也。

Translation:
Old Man of the Frontier Loses Horse

Good luck and bad luck create each other
and it is difficult to foresee their change.
A righteous man lived near the border.
For no reason, his horse ran off into barbarian territory.
Everyone [people] felt sorry for him.
[But] His father spoke [to him]:
"Who knows if that won't bring you good luck?"
Several months later,
his horse came back with a group of [good, noble] barbarian horses.
Everyone [people] congratulated him.
[But] His father spoke [to him]:
"Who knows if that won't bring you bad luck?"
Now his house is rich in horses
and the son mounted with joy/loved riding.
He fell and broke his leg.
Everyone [people] felt sorry for him.
[But] His father spoke [to him]:
"Who knows if that won't bring you good luck?"
One year later
the barbarians invaded across the border.
Adult men strung up their bows and went into battle.
Nine out of ten border residents were killed,
except for the son because of his broken leg.
Father and son were protected/both survived.
Hence: Bad luck brings good luck
and good luck brings bad luck.
This happens without end
and nobody can estimate it.

— Claude Larre et al. Les grands traités du Huainan zi, 1993, p. 208–209.

== Plot and statement ==
The parable tells the story of a farmer who living with his father close to the border separating their area from the barbarian territories. With no influence over his situation, the farmer goes through many situations varying from very good to very bad:

- His horse, a considerable part of his property and livelihood, runs away. Neighbors and friends offer condolences, but his father exclaims "Who knows if there's a silver lining in this?"
- After weeks, his horse finds its way back and brings along other horses from the barbarian territories, thus increasing the farmer's property. Neighbors and friends offer congratulations, but his father exclaims, "Who knows what misfortune this foretells?"
- Trying to ride one of the wild horses, the farmer falls and breaks his leg – which reduces his physical capacities. Neighbors and friends offer condolences yet again, but the father replies "Who knows if there's a silver lining in this?"
- When the barbarians attack the borderland, the injured son was not drafted and did not take part in battle, where many young men died. By staying back, the son and the father survived and escaped together.

These events are spontaneously judged by the neighbors, but the farmer's old father relativizes these judgments of the situations with his knowledge of Dào (i.e. The Right Way); Everything is an interplay of Yin and Yang, of light and shadow, of happiness and unhappiness, whether in the smallest details or in the great events of life.

Since in the framework of human perception it is impossible to recognize the future consequences of an event (and thus to know what is really 'good luck' or 'bad luck'), the old man's reaction to these events is a stoic equanimity, and thus the appropriate reaction. He reacts with wu wei (無爲; wú wéi; "not intervening', 'not acting") but this term should not be confused with apathy. In this knowledge he finds his calm and lasting, true happiness: he accepts life as it is. He understands that fortune and misfortune are intertwined just like all life stories are intertwined, such is the mystery of life.

The wisdom in the parable does not come from a teacher, a monk or a king, and it is not discussed at length. It comes from a simple, old man who shows this wisdom in very short sentences - repetitions, since there is nothing to add. This indicates that the knowledge of Dào is accessible to everyone.

Through the introductory and concluding sentences it is made clear that the parable shows only a small part of an infinite sequence: before the loss of the horse there were other lucky/unlucky situations and after fending off the barbarians, there will be others (i.e. the farmer can't use his injured leg properly and will depend on his old father to help and support him after the events of the story).

== Potential origin, chengyu, proverbs, and delimitations ==
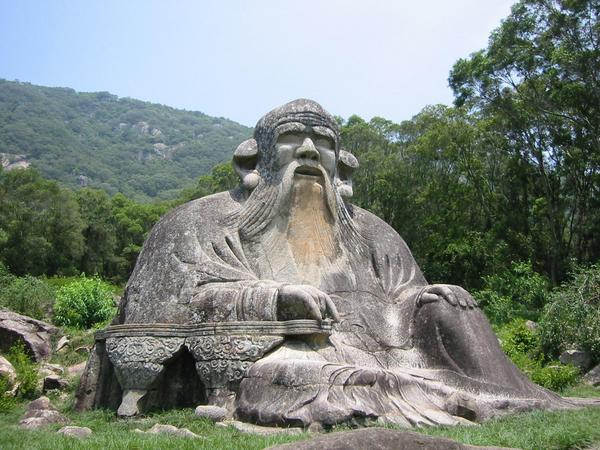
Stone sculpture of Laozi

A similar sentiment to the parable is expressed in chapter 58 of the Tao Te Ching by Laozi from the 6th to 4th century BC, namely, Misery is what happiness rests upon. Happiness is what misery lurks beneath. Who knows where it ends?

The first known version of the story is found in the Huainanzi, which was compiled around 139 BCE.

Among chéngyǔ (成語), traditional Chinese idiomatic expressions, one finds the saying Chinese: 塞翁失馬，焉知非福.; pinyin: Sài wēng shī mǎ, yān zhī fēi fú; trans. "The old man lost his horse, but it all turned out for the best". The meaning of the story is that something bad things can be a blessing in disguise.

In Chinese and Vietnamese, the shortened version of the proverb is titled "The old man on the frontier lost (his) horse" (Chinese: 塞翁失馬; pinyin: Sài Wēng Shī Mǎ; Vietnamese: Tái ông thất mã / Tái ông mất ngựa) and have a longer version that adds "How to know (if this is) fortuitous or not?" (Chinese: 塞翁失馬 焉知非福; pinyin: Sài Wēng Shī Mǎ Yān Zhī Fēi Fú; Vietnamese: Tái ông thất mã, yên tri phi phúc). In Japanese and Korean, the short versions translate to "The horse of the old man on the frontier" (Japanese: 塞翁が馬; rōmaji: Sai Ou Ga Uma; Korean: 새옹지마; romaja: Sae Ong Ji Ma; lit. 'The horse of the old man on the frontier') and the long versions translate to "Everything in life (is like) the horse of the old man on the frontier" (Japanese: 人間万事塞翁が馬; rōmaji: Ningen/Jinkan Banji Sai Ou Ga Uma; Korean: 인간만사 새옹지마; romaja: In Gan Man Sa Sae Ong Ji Ma)

Western parallels to the parable, but not identical, can be found in the following proverbs:

- A blessing in disguise
- Bad luck often brings good luck.
- Every cloud has a silver lining.
- Every ill-luck is good for something in a wise man's hand.
- Every medal has its dark side.
- Every tide has its ebb.
- No great loss without some small gain
- It is an ill wind that blows no one good.
- Nothing is so bad in which there is not something good.

In most of these proverbs, the hopeful perspective points 'in the direction of good luck'.

== Reception ==
Starting from the original parable, different versions of the story have been written, which are described in books and on the internet under titles such as The Taoist Farmer, The Farmer and his Horse, The Father, His Son and the Horse, The Old Man Loses a Horse, etc. The story is mostly cited in philosophical or religious texts and management or psychology advisors.

While in the original version the son loses his horse and the father comments, in recent (Western) versions a more direct view is found: The father himself is the horse's owner and directly comments on his situation. Most of these versions are longer and dramatically embellished, but the brevity and conciseness of the original text has the advantage of a simpler insight.

- Alan Watts told this story during Talks About Eastern Wisdom and Modern Life (1960–1969)
- Fritz B. Simon tells this story in his book Meine Psychose, mein Fahrrad und ich - Zur Selbstorganisation der Verrücktheit (1990), a basic introductory and instructional text on modern systems theory and radical constructionism.
- Richard Wiseman used a variation of the story in his book The Luck Factor (2003), to describe the difference in the processing of misfortune and strokes of fate in 'lucky devils' and 'unlucky fellows'.
- Coral Chen wrote and illustrated the children's book The Old Man Who Lost His Horse (2011) in English and Chinese.
- Mascha Kaléko used this subject in the poem Chinesische Legende (1983).

== In popular culture ==
In 14th episode of the fifth season of Northern Exposure, which aired on January 24, 1994, Marilyn Whirlwind (Elaine Miles) shared a variant of this story with Ed Chigliak (Darren E. Burrows).

The story is used as a framing device for much of season four of the television show The Last Man On Earth. A variation of parable is told by the character "La Abuela" Gordillo (Alma Martinez) and is a recurring theme for several subsequent episodes. The deus ex machina in the season 4 episode Hamilton/Berg of the show could be described as the culmination of seemingly lucky/unlucky events.

The Bluey episode "The Sign" features a retelling of the story that is referred back to several times throughout the episode.

Charlie Wilson's War features the story during the celebration of news of the Soviet withdrawal from Afghanistan. Near the end of the film, CIA agent Gust Avrakotos shares the story as a cautionary tale while ascribing it to a "Zen master".

The principle of the parable has been used for comedic effect, most notably in a routine by comedian and Hee Haw cast member Archie Campbell. It begins with Campbell telling straight man Roy Clark about the recent death of a relative, to which Clark responds, "That's bad." Campbell replies, "No, that's good," and says he received a substantial inheritance. Clark says, "That's good!," but Campbell replies, "No, that's bad," and explains that he lost most of it to taxes. The exchange continues with several similar flip-flops of fortune before concluding with Campbell saying his wife is so upset with him, she plans to leave him. Clark says, "That's good!" and Campbell enthusiastically agrees.

Similarly, comedian Andrew Hamilton told a version of this parable where the son is shot by conscription officers because of his broken leg, and the father agrees that this is very bad. Hamilton explains that the moral is that "sometimes in life we can be too philosophical, when instead we just need to acknowledge that life is a scorching hot dumpster fire and we will probably never recover."

"Good Luck John" by Joe Crookston features a bluegrass retelling of the same story, with a few additional story elements, such as marrying the nurse who cared for his broken limb.

== Literature ==
- Charles Le Blanc, Mathieu Rémi: Philosophes taoïstes. Volume 2: Huainan Zi. Gallimard, Paris 2003, ISBN 2-07-011424-4 (Bibliothèque de la Pléiade. 494).
- Claude Larre, Isabelle Robinet, Elisabeth Rochet de la Vallée: Les grands traités du Huainan zi. du Cerf, Paris 1993, ISBN 2-204-04652-3 (Variétés sinologiques. NS 75); translation of chapters 1, 7, 11, 13, 18.
