= Chinese farmer =

Chinese farmer may refer to:

- One who practices agriculture in China
- In online role-playing games, a gold farmer whose in-game behavior noticeably stands out in comparison to the majority of subscribers
- The old man lost his horse, one of the most famous parables from the Huainanzi about a Chinese farmer

== See also ==
- Chinese Farm (disambiguation)
