= Harold Clunn =

British shipping agent and author

Harold Philip Clunn
- Born: 13 April 1879; Southport, Lancashire, England
- Died: 19 February 1956 (aged 76); Royal Sussex County Hospital, Brighton, Sussex, England
- Occupation(s): Shipping agent, author
- Known for: London Rebuilt, 1897–1927 (1927); The Face of London (1932); London Marches On (1947)

Harold Philip Clunn (13 April 1879 – 19 February 1956) was a British shipping agent and non-fiction author known for his topographical works in the Face of... series. Reviewers commented on the exhaustive scope of his work and his unsentimental attitude to the expansion of London and the destruction of its buildings through redevelopment and during the Blitz of the Second World War.

== Early life ==
Harold Clunn was born in Southport, Lancashire, on 13 April 1879, to Philip Edward Clunn, a merchant and banker and the founder of the London Shipping Conference, and his wife Emily Ebbs.

== Career ==
He worked as a shipping agent, travelling to the United States with his father at the age of 18 in 1897, and on his own on other occasions such as in 1904, 1909, and 1920. In 1909, Harold Clunn was a party to a legal case reported in The Times in respect of £29,218 lent by his father, who had died on 10 March 1909, to a Mrs Rose Phoebe Ackland of Monte Carlo. On one occasion, Philip Clunn had given Mrs Ackland £5,000 in banknotes. The court ruled that the money was a loan and should be repaid. By 1914 he was the governing director of George W. Wheatley & Co. Ltd. of 95, Upper Thames Street, London E.C., shipping agents and carriers.

== Writing ==
Clunn's first book was London Rebuilt, 1897–1927 (1927) after which he published the philosophical work An Analysis of Life. An attempt to conduct an independent enquiry into the leading problems which confront mankind (1928). All his later works were of a topographical nature, beginning with Famous South Coast Pleasure Resorts Past and Present (1929) and three volumes in the Face of... series: London, Paris, and the Home Counties. Clunn was praised by The Spectator for his industry in compiling the volume on London which described the changes in the city over the previous century through 25 walks with additional visits to the home counties. The Times also noted the impressive scope of the work, as well as Clunn's unsentimental attitude that greeted with pleasure the expansion of the city and the replacement of old buildings by new.

In London Marches On, published in 1947 shortly after the end of the Second World War, the tone was forward-looking as indicated by the title. In a similar vein to The Face of London, Clunn did not regret all of the destruction of the war, seeing the Blitz as a blessing in disguise for wiping away the slum areas of London and other buildings not befitting the capital of the British Empire. Clunn compared the devastation of the Blitz to the damage caused by the Great Fire of 1666, both providing an opportunity to replace old and squalid buildings with better quality stock such as the "fine new generation" of blocks of flats being built all over London.

Clunn's literary works have also been attributed to Horace Jefferson, the author of The Diary of a Governing Director (1934), illustrated by Bernard Gribble who married Harold Clunn's sister Eleanor Mabel Clunn.

== Death ==
Harold Clunn died on 19 February 1956 at the Royal Sussex County Hospital. His address at the time of his death was 58 Regency Square, Brighton. Administration of his estate was granted to Eleanor Mabel Gribble, née Clunn, on an estate of £619.

== Selected publications ==
Clunn's publications include:

- London Rebuilt, 1897–1927. John Murray, London, 1927.
- An Analysis of Life. An attempt to conduct an independent enquiry into the leading problems which confront mankind. Simpkin Marshall, London, 1928.
- Famous South Coast Pleasure Resorts past and present, etc. T. Whittingham, London, 1929.
- The Face of London: The record of a century's changes and development. Simpkin Marshall, London, 1932. New edition, Spring Books, 1951. New edition 1962 with E. R. Wethersett.
- The Face of Paris: The record of a century's changes and developments. Simpkin Marshall, London, 1933.
- The Face of the Home Counties: Portrayed in a series of eighteen week-end drives from London. Simpkin Marshall, London, 1936.
- London Marches On: A record of the changes which have taken place in the metropolis of the British Empire between the two world wars and much that is scheduled for reconstruction. Caen Press, London, 1947.
- The Capital by-the-Sea. A survey of Brighton, Hove and Worthing, including the adjacent towns of Portslade, Southwick, Shoreham, Lancing and the surrounding countryside. Southern Publishing, Brighton, 1953.
