= Chinese Farm =

Chinese Farm may refer to:

- The Chinese Farm, an Egyptian agricultural facility and the location of the Battle of the Chinese Farm during the Yom Kippur War
- Chinese Farm (board game), a board game based upon the battle

== See also ==
- Chinese farmer (disambiguation)
