= The Last Man on Earth (TV series) =

American comedy television series (2015–2018)

- Genre: Comedy; Post-apocalyptic
- Created by: Will Forte
- Starring: Will Forte; Kristen Schaal; January Jones; Mel Rodriguez; Cleopatra Coleman; Mary Steenburgen
- Composer: Mark Mothersbaugh
- Country of origin: United States
- Original language: English
- No. of seasons: 4
- No. of episodes: 67 (list of episodes)

Production
- Executive producers: Will Forte; Phil Lord Christopher Miller; Seth Cohen; Andy Bobrow; John Solomon; Erik Durbin
- Producer: Chris Plourde
- Cinematography: Christian Sprenger
- Camera setup: Single-camera
- Running time: 22 minutes
- Production companies: The Si Fi Company; Lord Miller Productions; 20th Century Fox Television

Original release
- Network: Fox
- Release: March 1, 2015 – May 6, 2018

The Last Man on Earth is an American post-apocalyptic comedy television series created by Will Forte. It aired on the Fox television network from March 1, 2015, to May 6, 2018. In addition to Forte starring in the title role, the series also starred Kristen Schaal, January Jones, Mel Rodriguez, Cleopatra Coleman and Mary Steenburgen as a small group of survivors.

Originally introduced as a mid-season replacement, the series aired 67 episodes over four seasons. It ended with a cliffhanger episode, to be resolved in the fifth season, but was canceled the week after the fourth season ended.

== Plot ==
In late 2020, almost a year after a deadly virus sweeps the world, Phil Miller is seemingly the only human survivor in the United States. As he searches for others and paints signs in every state saying he is alive in his hometown of Tucson, Arizona, he finds no one. After years of being alone, he decides to run his truck into a rock to die by suicide. Looking off to the side right before he hits, he sees smoke and discovers another survivor, Carol Pilbasian. Despite annoying each other, Carol believes it is their job as the last two survivors to repopulate the world, also insisting that Phil marry her so their children aren't born out of wedlock. Although Phil thinks it's ridiculous to hang on to "old world" traditions, they marry for re-population purposes. Five more survivors – Melissa, Todd, Erica, Gail and another Phil Miller – eventually trickle into Tucson, creating a small group. When Phil's irritating attitude leads to his banishment from Tucson, Carol leaves with him.

In season two, it is the middle of 2023 and Phil and Carol continue their road trip. They discover the Tucson-group has relocated to Malibu, California, and travel there to reunite and rebuild trust. Meanwhile, Phil's astronaut brother Mike Miller crashes down to Earth and finds his way to Malibu, where he joins the small group briefly before getting sick. Mike is ostracized by most of the group for seemingly having been infected with the virus.

In season three, following a threatening encounter with paranoid and violent survivor Pat Brown, the original group moves to a self-sustaining office building in San Jose, California where Melissa struggles with mental instability and Carol discovers a young boy living in the woods, whom they name Jasper. As time passes, Erica gives birth to a girl she names Dawn and the group decides to leave the United States for Mexico after seeing a nuclear facility meltdown close to the office.

In season four, Pamela Brinton, a rich woman living in a bunker, discovers the group via a drone. The group ends up on a boat and meet Pamela after she kills Pat. Pamela kidnaps Phil, stranding the rest of the group on an island. The group meet Glenn, who has been on the island since before the virus broke out. Pamela's guilt over abandoning the group catches up with her, and she sails back to the island with Phil. The survivors move to Zihuatanejo, Mexico and there, Carol gives birth to twin daughters only to become pregnant again a few weeks later. Erica becomes pregnant again with Todd's first child. Mike temporarily rejoins the group (having recovered from what was actually a weakened immune system) before leaving to try and start his own family. During a hunt for the missing Jasper, Phil and Todd end up at a jail and meeting Karl, who poses as a jailer but is in fact a cannibal. Karl terrifies them to the point that they decide to kill him, but are spared from the task when Karl finds a Rubik's Cube that once solved, explodes. Following a brief reunion with a recovered Mike, the original group moves to Tapachula, where they are found and surrounded by dozens of underground survivors.

=== Intended plot continuation ===
After the series was cancelled in May 2018, four days after season 4 ended, an August 2018 interview with series creator Will Forte revealed that the plan for the subsequent season was to have both groups of survivors live together and gain one another's trust before the original group – as asymptomatic carriers of the virus – inadvertently infected and killed the survivors who had quarantined for years underground.

== Cast ==
=== Main ===
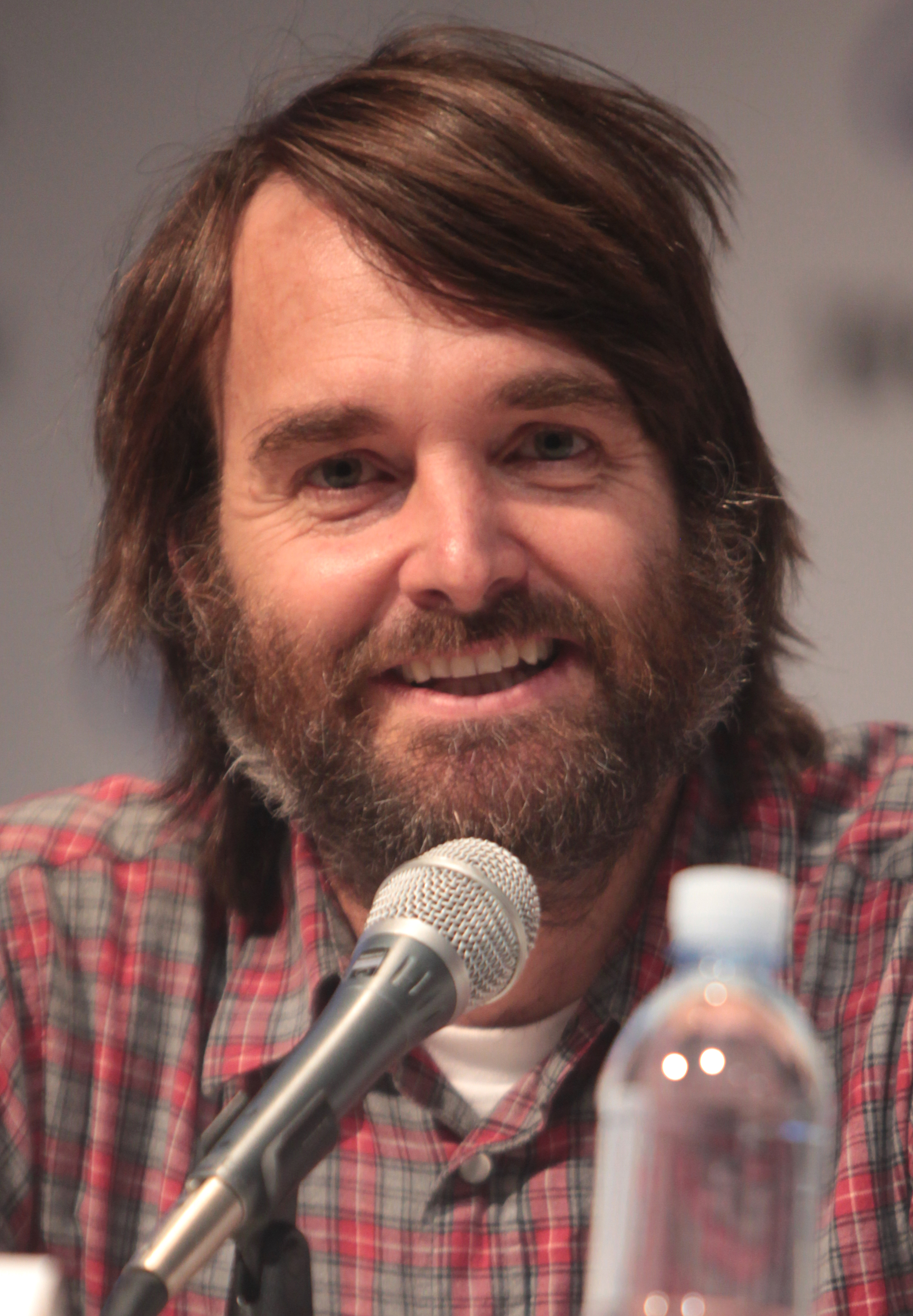
Series creator Will Forte plays the lead role of Phil Miller.

- Will Forte as Philip Tandy Miller (first addressed by the other characters as "Phil", then "Tandy"), an average, socially challenged man and seemingly the only human survivor after a virus wiped out nearly the entire population about a year earlier. He moves back to his hometown of Tucson, Arizona, after having painted "Alive in Tucson" on billboards and highway signs in all 50 states, hoping others might see the message. In his pre-virus life, he worked temp jobs and lived in a studio apartment for which his parents paid the rent. Out of loneliness, he draws faces on various sports balls as his "friends", begins speaking to them, and gives them such names as Terence, Trent and D'Arby. In season 1, to avoid confusion with the second Phil Miller, Phil claims his middle name is Tandy, which the other characters use to address him despite finding it unusual. Phil is married to Carol and they have twin girls together. Forte describes him as "a selfish person who sometimes borders on being a flat-out sociopath". Jacob Tremblay portrays young Phil, who appears to his brother Mike in multiple visions in the episode "Pitch Black".
- Kristen Schaal as Carol Andrew Pilbasian Miller, a notary from Delaware who sees Phil's "Alive in Tucson" sign and travels there to find survivors. She pressures Phil to marry her so they can work towards repopulating the Earth with "legitimate" children, but they are a poor match early on as Phil is not attracted to her (something that gets reinforced when a prettier survivor named Melissa makes her way to Tucson) and Carol spends most of her time badgering Phil for his bad behavior. Carol is shown to be compassionate and is good friends with Melissa and Todd but can hold grudges and be stridently moralistic. Carol and Phil divorce in the middle of the first season, but Carol chooses to leave with Phil after he is banished from Tucson and they subsequently remarry. In the second season, she and Phil regain the survivors' trust, and she becomes pregnant with Phil's child after he finally tells her he loves her. In the fourth season, she gives birth to twin daughters Bezequille and Mike, the latter named for Phil's brother.
- January Jones as Melissa Chartres (pronounced Shart), a former real estate agent from Akron, Ohio, who used to be married to the late Greg until he cheated on her with a police officer. She meets Phil and Carol after they crash their pickup truck into her limousine. She saw Phil's original "Alive in Tucson" sign and traveled to Tucson before Carol. Phil is initially very attracted to her and frequently vies for her affection despite having just married Carol, but Melissa does not like or trust him. She begins dating Todd after he joins the group. In the second season, Melissa decides she does not want to have children and breaks up with Todd, but when she changes her mind, she and Gail eventually agree to simultaneously date Todd. In season 3, Melissa kills Darrell, one of paranoiac Pat Brown's crew, and consequently starts acting strangely, ultimately forcing Todd to lock her in a focus-group room to stop her from jumping off a building. The survivors help cure her condition using Clozapine, and Melissa marries Todd near the end of the third season.
- Mel Rodriguez as Todd Dimas Rodriguez, another surviving man who, while on his way to Mexico, finds Phil and company after he sees some fireworks set off by Phil. Kind and selfless, Todd's nature leads to him becoming the most likable member of the group, much to Phil's increasing annoyance. He and Melissa become very close and begin a romantic relationship shortly after they meet. In season 2, Todd's love life becomes increasingly complicated: he finds himself torn between Melissa, who breaks up with him for a while; Gail, who starts dating him simultaneously with Melissa; Erica, who tells him that the late Phil II chose him as a surrogate father for her baby; and even Carol, who approaches him with a surprise request to impregnate her when she thinks Phil (Tandy) is sterile. In season 3, when Gail breaks up with him, Todd hopes to win back Melissa until he is frightened by her strange behavior resulting from killing Darrell. He is eventually able to cure her condition using Clozapine, and they marry. In the fourth season, after Melissa decides once again that she does not want to have children, Todd struggles with baby fever until Erica agrees to have a child with him, and she announces her pregnancy with his first child at the end of "Designated Survivors".
- Cleopatra Coleman as Erica Dundee, an Australian woman and self-described "political nerd." After the outbreak of the virus, she met Gail at the White House and the two became traveling companions. They discover Phil upon spotting a fire he started, then move in with the rest of the survivors. In the second season, Erica becomes pregnant with Phil II's child but decides to not involve him in their child's life when he openly flirts with Carol. In "Smart and Stupid," she tells Mike, whom she is dating, that she was imprisoned for armed bank robbery before traveling to the United States and getting a job at the State Department under an assumed name. Toward the end of season 3, she gives birth to her daughter, whom she names Dawn. She later starts a romantic relationship with Gail and they get married in season 4.
- Mary Steenburgen as Gail Klosterman (seasons 2–4; recurring season 1), a chef and former restaurant owner from Wilmington, North Carolina. After the outbreak of the virus, she met Erica, and the two became traveling companions. Gail mentions having had a husband but does not reveal what happened to him. In season 2, she develops a relationship with another survivor named Gordon (Will Ferrell), but after Gordon dies of a heart attack, she has trouble finding closure and even dresses up a mannequin to look like Gordon, until she starts dating Todd. In season 3, she tells Carol, who wants Gail to adopt her so her child can have a grandmother, that she also had a child who died before the outbreak of the virus. To avoid being annoyed by Carol about their newly formed family, Gail finds solitude in an elevator, but the elevator loses its power and traps her inside until Phil restores the power in "The Spirit of St. Lewis". She begins a romantic relationship with Erica during the six months after the episode "Name 20 Picnics...Now!", which continues into the season 4 and leads to them getting married.

=== Recurring ===
- Boris Kodjoe as Philip Stacy "Phil" Miller (seasons 1–2), a former member of the Special Forces from High Point, North Carolina. He discovers the rest of the survivors after finding the original Phil sunburned and unconscious on a billboard. Also a former contractor, his skills with construction—as well as his good looks—soon make him a favorite among the women in the group. He and the original Phil, who must go by "Tandy" after losing a Jenga competition to him, become rivals shortly after meeting. In season 2, he openly flirts with Carol while he is dating Erica. He attempts to leave the group, frustrated by their lack of seriousness and dependence on him to do all of the physical labor, but learns that Erica is pregnant with his child. Just as he mends his relationship with her and Tandy, he suffers from appendicitis and requests that Erica not let Tandy help raise their child if he does not survive. He finally dies during a botched appendectomy performed by Gail and Todd, neither of whom has medical experience. After the group says goodbye to Phil, Tandy learns that, despite Phil's earlier claim that he had no middle name, his middle name was Stacy.
- Jason Sudeikis as Michael Shelby "Mike" Miller (seasons 2 and 4; guest season 1), the more successful younger brother of Phil (Tandy) and an astronaut who survives in Earth's orbit aboard the International Space Station. Like Phil and his sports balls, he talks to pet worms out of loneliness. He also appears in a still photograph in the premiere episode with his brother and parents. In the season 2 mid-season finale, Mike begins his return to Earth with a newborn companion worm. After he lands in the sea, paranoid seaman Pat Brown abandons him on shore, but he finds his way to Malibu using an "Alive in Tucson" sign, his inference that Phil would have moved into the cul-de-sac following the apocalypse, and a letter from Melissa. Though his sibling rivalry with Phil resurfaces, the brothers eventually reconcile and explain to each other how their parents were proud of them both. In "Smart and Stupid", Mike starts coughing up blood, a sign of the virus, and departs to avoid having the group grieve his death. When Phil finds Mike at their childhood home in Tucson, they spend a day growing closer than ever before Mike begs Phil in his "dying wish" to leave. Phil returns to the house briefly in season 3 to see if Mike is still alive but chooses not to enter Mike's bedroom, leaving without confirming his brother's status. Mike rejoins the group near the end of the season 4, having recovered from what was actually a weakened immune system he suffered from being in space. He is then introduced to his new nieces Bezequille and Mike, who he is happy to learn was named Mike in his honor. The thermal imaging device Mike used to find the group soon indicates a mysterious blob, which the group does not initially know means there is a colony of dozens of survivors living nearby. He then leaves in hopes of finding a way to start his own family.
- Kenneth Choi as Lewis (season 3), an arborist from Seattle whose partner Mark is presumed to have been killed by the virus. He first comes to Malibu as part of Pat's crew but defects and joins the main group when Pat refuses to make peace with Phil (Tandy). He greatly fears Pat, especially since Pat told him he previously killed someone. After moving into a self-sustaining office building in San Jose with the rest of the group, he considers the possibility that Mark might still be alive in Tokyo and begins teaching himself aviation so he can fly there and investigate. In the middle of season 3, Lewis is killed 10 seconds after takeoff when he attempts his first flight in a real plane.
- Keith L. Williams as "Jasper" (seasons 3–4), an initially silent young boy who is discovered in the background of Carol and Gail's family photos wearing a Yoda costume. Phil names him "Jasper" after his JanSport backpack, and the child chooses Erica as his parental figure despite Phil's attempts to bond with him. The group put together a party for him that celebrates every major holiday packed into one and make various attempts to get his attention and obedience to their authority. Six months later, he finally starts speaking. Following the births of Dawn, Bezequille and Mike, Carol and Erica begin competing for their children to start relationships with Jasper so they don't end up alone without any playmates. Jasper becomes uncomfortable with this competition along with Todd's repeated attempts to bond with him, so he runs away from the house. Two episodes after his disappearance, Melissa, seemingly the only adult who can bond with Jasper, reveals that she knows his location and has been dropping off coolers of food near him so he can eat.
- Kristen Wiig as Pamela Brinton (season 4; guest season 3), a wealthy socialite and philanthropist who hid from the virus in an underground bunker with her dog Jeremy. During her time in the bunker, she learned to pilot its surveillance drone, which Gail first saw near the end of the second season. She leaves the bunker upon discovering the others even though the connection is lost because Melissa shoots the drone out of the sky. Pamela introduces herself to the group after shooting Pat in the head to save them. She then abducts Tandy for herself upon hearing the other ladies' plans to abandon her, but she redeems herself as she realizes the errors of her actions and joins castaway Glenn on a search for his children.
- Fred Armisen as Karl Cowperthwaite (season 4), a cannibalistic serial killer who was arrested before the outbreak of the virus and placed in a prison near Zihuatanejo, Mexico, where Phil and Todd find him while looking for Jasper. His preferred method of killing his victims is by bringing them to his house, painting portraits of them, and killing them, presumably with a knife. Karl kills the only other survivor in the prison, a guard named Martinez (Geoffrey Rivas), who had planned to leave Karl to die alone, before Phil and Todd find him. Karl steals Martinez's uniform and identity and is welcomed into the main group, but Phil and Todd soon catch him eating part of a long-deceased corpse. Though the survivors put him back in prison, Karl escapes and is eventually killed after he solves a Rubik's Cube, setting off a bomb hidden inside it.

=== Guests ===
- Alexandra Daddario as Victoria (season 1), an attractive woman that Phil (Tandy) hallucinates before he meets Carol.
- Will Ferrell as Gordon Vanderkruik (season 2), a survivor living in Malibu, who dies from a heart attack from the shock of Carol's sudden appearance. When Gordon first met the other survivors some time between the events of the first and second seasons, he developed a relationship with Gail. His grave indicates that he was born in 1978 and died in 2023.
- Mark Boone Junior as Patrick "Pat" Brown (seasons 2–3), the first person Mike encounters after returning to Earth. He wanders the sea on a yacht, fearing that the virus has still contaminated the land and that anyone he meets could be carrying it. He also believes the U.S. government has gone into hiding in bunkers and plotted a conspiracy to trap survivors. He abandons Mike in Miami when he thinks he has accidentally killed him by exposing him to the virus. Between the events of "Pitch Black" and "30 Years of Science Down the Tubes", Pat meets two other survivors named Darrell and Lewis while sailing around North America via the Northwest Passage. Armed with rifles, the three men approach the Malibu mansion at the start of the third season. Although Pat and Lewis later convince the group of their peaceful intent, Pat suddenly turns on them when he realizes Phil and Mike are related, but he is hit with the A-Team van as everyone else escapes from him in it. He is presumed dead until his body and boat vanish. When he sees the group driving towards a marina at the end of season 3, Pat tries to kill them before Pamela shoots him in the head.
- Jon Hamm as Darrell (season 3), a man who sails to Malibu with Pat and Lewis but is shot and killed by Melissa in the ensuing confusion on their intentions.
- Laura Dern as Catherine (season 3), Pamela's socialite friend, who purchases a bunker to escape infection but ultimately succumbs to the virus before she can enter.
- Timothy V. Murphy as Benjamin Brinton (season 3), Pamela's husband, who dies from the virus.
- Jack Black as Rear Admiral Roy Billups (season 4), a United States Navy officer and Pamela's lover whom Pat shoots before she finally kills Pat outright.
- Chris Elliott as Glenn (season 4), a castaway whom the group meets on a remote island in the Pacific Ocean. He missed the apocalypse and thus knows nothing about the virus until Carol informs him about it, then joins the group in their return to the mainland, where he begins a relationship with Pamela and invites her on a search for his children.
- Alma Martinez as "La Abuela" Gordillo (season 4), a Mexican drug cartel leader who, in a flashback to 2017, occupies the Zihuatanejo mansion wherein the main group settles in the present before she is slain by her henchman Panchito, who is presumably an undercover police officer.
- Jack Guzman as Hector (season 4), one of La Abuela's henchmen who, in a flashback to 2017, prepares a bomb to avoid being killed by her before hiding the bomb in a Rubik's Cube.
- Leighton Meester as Zoe (season 4), a woman with whom Karl goes on an unsuccessful date.
- Martin Short as an unnamed sport utility vehicle driver (season 4), whom Karl kills so he can quickly escape to Mexico in his stolen car.

== Background and production ==
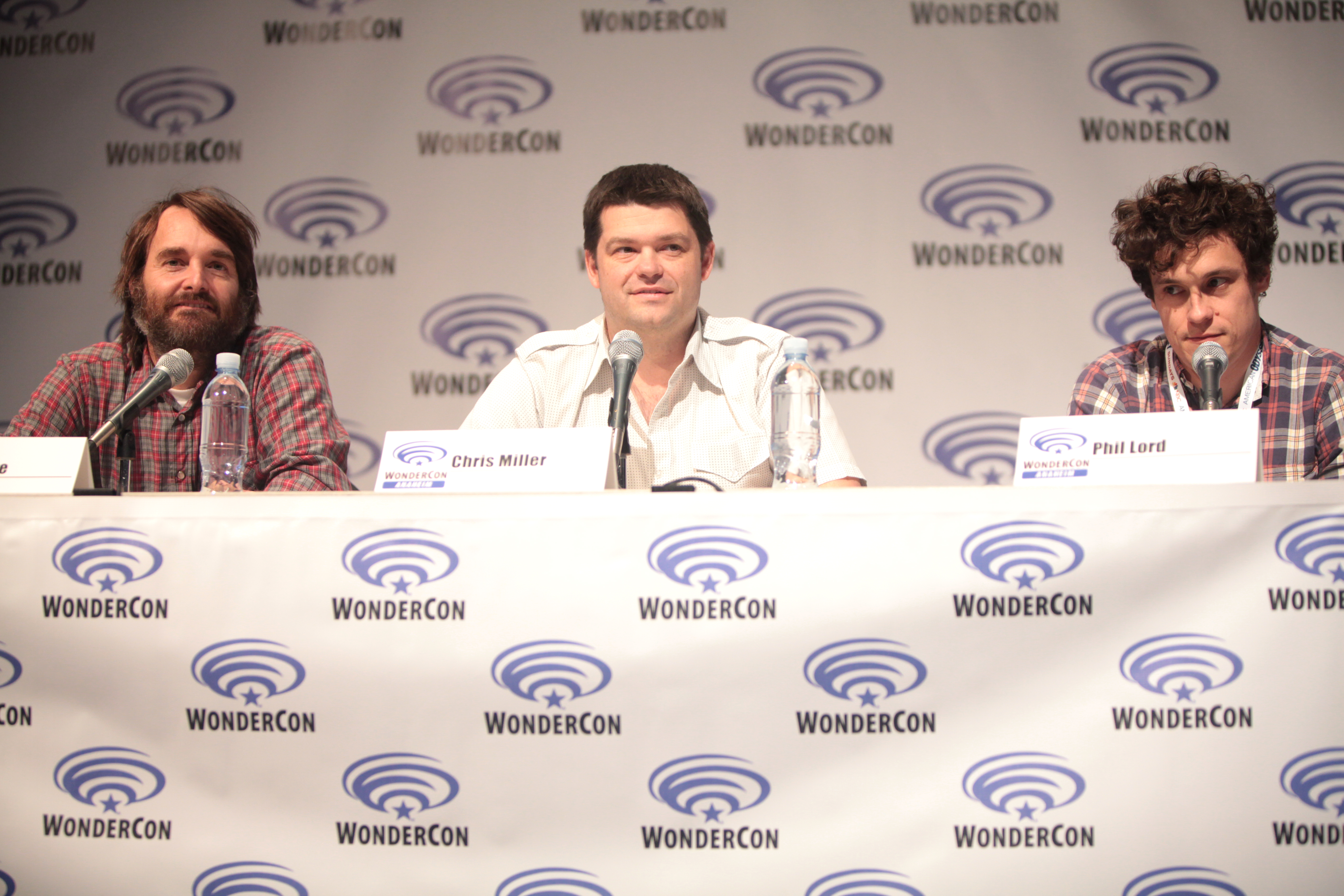
Forte alongside executive producers Christopher Miller and Phil Lord, who directed the first two episodes

The show originated from the writing team of Phil Lord and Christopher Miller, who had the idea initially for a feature film. They approached longtime collaborator and former Saturday Night Live cast member Will Forte with the premise, who "took a spark to it and took it in his own direction", according to Miller. He was partially inspired by the series Life After People. "I love comedy where there's a lot of tension and even though it's very far-fetched, it seems very relatable", said Forte of the premise. Forte's treatment for the series, crafted over a weekend, was pitched around Hollywood to positive responses. They mainly pitched to cable and Internet services, as Forte believed a broadcast network would be stricter on content. In their pitch, much of the outline of the series' first season was formulated. Fox, the show's eventual distributor, was instead doing "something different" and specific to his vision, according to Miller.

Forte spoke on the show's creative freedom in a 2015 interview:

I think we always saw this as more of a cable show, to be honest. They claimed from the get-go that they didn't want to change the tone of the show, and I think I went in with an eyebrow raised, thinking, okay, well when's it going to come out that we have to change it around? And they were great. They stuck by their pledge and let us make this different type of show. We're so happy to have had this experience. It was just a great, great experience with Fox.

Filming the series was challenging. For example, maintaining silence and not picking up sounds of cars in the distance made it difficult. In addition to Forte's fascination with Life After People, similar films discussed while writing the show included The Omega Man, I Am Legend, and 28 Days Later. Fox particularly appreciated the heart of the story, with its universal theme. According to Lord, "We always talked about that this is a person who is very flawed, and a person who maybe needed the entire world to end in order for him to become his best self. [...] That was our big thought, well here's a guy who maybe he wasn't the best guy in the regular world, but if you took the regular world away, could he eventually get back to being the person that all of us hope that we can be."

The name of the main character, Phil Tandy Miller, is based on the names of the two executive producers Phil Lord and Christopher Miller.

For the second season, Dan Sterling joined as executive producer and took over the role of showrunner from Forte, who was the showrunner for the first season.

The main recording location for the series was a 20th Century Fox studio in Chatsworth, California.

== Episodes ==
Season	Episodes	Originally released	
Season	Episodes	First released	Last released
1	13	March 1, 2015	May 3, 2015
2	18	September 27, 2015	May 15, 2016
3	18	September 25, 2016	May 7, 2017
4	18	October 1, 2017	May 6, 2018

== Reception ==
=== Ratings ===
For its one-hour premiere, The Last Man on Earth received 5.75 million viewers with an average 2.4 rating among adults 18–49, making it the highest-rated broadcast series of the evening in that demographic. While ratings declined overall, the show did well enough with young male viewers to justify renewal.

Viewership and ratings per season of The Last Man on Earth
Season	Timeslot (ET)	Episodes	First aired		Last aired		TV season	Viewership rank	Avg. viewers (millions)
Season	Timeslot (ET)	Episodes	Date	Viewers (millions)	Date	Viewers (millions)	TV season	Viewership rank	Avg. viewers (millions)
1	Sunday 9:30 pm	13	March 1, 2015	5.75	May 3, 2015	3.51	2014–15	93	6.07
2	Sunday 9:30 pm	18	September 27, 2015	3.14	May 15, 2016	2.23	2015–16	114	4.23
3	Sunday 9:30 pm	18	September 25, 2016	2.23	May 7, 2017	1.84	2016–17	122	3.29
4	Sunday 9:30 pm	18	October 1, 2017	2.28	May 6, 2018	1.66	2017–18	152	2.93

=== Critical reception ===
My recommendation comes with a caveat: there is no roadmap for this kind of show, and it could easily fall apart quickly. But I will say this for The Last Man on Earth: it does not seem like the sort of thing that would be a primetime network sitcom. And that's precisely why it should be one.

— James Poniewozik of Time

The Last Man on Earth received generally positive reviews from critics. On Metacritic, which assigns a normalized rating out of 100 based on reviews from critics, the first season has a score of 72, based on 30 reviews, indicating "generally favorable reviews". On Rotten Tomatoes, the season has an 84% approval rating with an average score of 7.7 out of 10 based on 51 reviews. The site's critical consensus is, "It may run out of steam before the season's over, but The Last Man on Earth's ambitious concept and comedic undertone are enough to lure viewers in." Tim Goodman of The Hollywood Reporter called the show "a genre-busting breakout that's creative, nuanced and inspired". Robert Bianco of USA Today praised Forte's "audacity, inventiveness and achievement". Hank Stuever of The Washington Post called it "a charming and intelligent sendup of pop culture's obsession with the end of everything". Slate's Willa Paskin called the program "well-made, polished, odd, surprisingly funny". "For a show that shouldn't really work at all, Last Man works pretty well", remarked Margaret Lyons of Vulture.

Entertainment Weekly's Jeff Jensen called it "profoundly funny", and sustainable if it continues the "ingenuity, surprises, and craftsmanship". "I was impressed by The Last Man on Earth, and hope it can continue to spin stories and character development out of its somewhat narrow premise", wrote Matthew Gilbert of The Boston Globe.

Several critics, such as Maureen Ryan of The Huffington Post and David Hinckley of the New York Daily News, questioned the show's future. Mike Hale of The New York Times deemed the show "well made, meticulous in its comic details and pleasantly acted", though noting that part of the show's appeal "dissipates" past the pilot episode. Brian Lowry of Variety opined that "the premise calls for a level of creativity from the producers that these episodes don't consistently deliver. That's not to say 'I wouldn't watch him if he were the last man on Earth.' But like the fate of humanity within the series, while the future certainly isn't hopeless, neither does it look particularly bright."

Subsequent seasons also received positive reviews from critics. On Rotten Tomatoes, the second season has an 86% approval rating with an average score of 7.8 out of 10 based on 14 reviews. The site's critical consensus is, "Season two of The Last Man on Earth brings a change of venue and renewed focus on the chemistry between Forte and Schaal, and may win back some viewers who were turned off in season one." The third season has a 78% approval rating with an average score of 7.1 out of 10 based on 9 reviews, with a critical consensus of, "Though it at times feels stuck in place, The Last Man on Earth's third season manages to find a way to make the end of the world fun again." The fourth season has a 92% approval rating with an average score of 7 out of 10 based on 13 reviews, with a critical consensus of, "The Last Man on Earth's fourth and final season is an apocalyptic affirmation of friendship, plumbing such joyful chemistry between its ensemble that it will satisfy audiences in spite of the cliffhanger conclusion."

=== Accolades ===
Year	Award	Category	Recipients	Result	Ref.
2015	Critics' Choice Television Award	Best Actor in a Comedy Series	Will Forte	Nominated	
2015	Primetime Emmy Award	Outstanding Lead Actor in a Comedy Series	Will Forte	Nominated	
2015	Primetime Emmy Award	Outstanding Writing for a Comedy Series	Will Forte for "Alive in Tucson"	Nominated	
2015	Primetime Emmy Award	Outstanding Directing for a Comedy Series	Phil Lord and Christopher Miller for "Alive in Tucson"	Nominated	
2015	Primetime Emmy Award	Outstanding Single-Camera Picture Editing for a Comedy Series	Stacey Schroeder	Nominated	
2015	EWwy Award	Outstanding Comedy Series	The Last Man on Earth	Nominated	
2015	EWwy Award	Outstanding Supporting Actress in a Comedy Series	Kristen Schaal	Nominated	
2015	68th Writers Guild of America Awards	New Series	The Last Man on Earth	Nominated	
2015	68th Writers Guild of America Awards	Episodic Comedy	Will Forte ("Alive in Tucson")	Nominated	
2016	6th Critics' Choice Television Awards	Best Comedy Series	The Last Man on Earth	Nominated	
2016	6th Critics' Choice Television Awards	Best Actor in a Comedy Series	Will Forte	Nominated	
2016	68th Primetime Emmy Awards	Outstanding Lead Actor in a Comedy Series	Will Forte	Nominated	

== Home media ==
The first season was released on DVD in region 1 on September 22, 2015. The set contains audio commentaries for "The Elephant in the Room" and "Screw the Moon"; The Last Man on Earth Q&A Panel; "Survival of the Funniest: Creating The Last Man on Earth" featurette; deleted scenes; and a gag reel.
