= List of The Last Man on Earth episodes =

The Last Man on Earth is an American post-apocalyptic comedy television series created by and starring Will Forte. The series premiered on Fox on March 1, 2015. On April 8, 2015, the show was renewed for a second season, which premiered on September 27, 2015. On March 24, 2016, the show was renewed for a third season, which premiered on September 25, 2016. On May 10, 2017, Fox renewed the series for a fourth season, which premiered on October 1, 2017.

During the course of the series, 67 episodes of The Last Man on Earth aired over four seasons.

On May 10, 2018, Fox canceled the series after four seasons.

== Series overview ==
Season	Episodes	Originally released	
Season	Episodes	First released	Last released
1	13	March 1, 2015	May 3, 2015
2	18	September 27, 2015	May 15, 2016
3	18	September 25, 2016	May 7, 2017
4	18	October 1, 2017	May 6, 2018

== Episodes ==
=== Season 1 (2015) ===
No. overall	No. in season	Title	Directed by	Written by	Original release date	Prod. code	U.S. viewers (millions)
1	1	"Alive in Tucson"	Phil Lord & Christopher Miller	Will Forte	March 1, 2015	1AYB01	5.75
After a virus wipes out most of humanity, average man Phil Miller (Will Forte) scours North America for other survivors but finds no one. During his travels, he paints "Alive in Tucson" on billboards and highway signs, hoping others might see the message. Returning to his hometown of Tucson, Arizona in the summer of 2020, he moves into Bonita Estates, a luxurious, gated cul-de-sac; hoards priceless artifacts and adult magazines; uses a pool as a toilet; and breaks or destroys whatever amuses him. About five months later, he feels lonely and depressed with no one else to celebrate his birthday, so he adopts assorted sports balls as "friends" and draws faces on them after watching Cast Away, then flirts with a mannequin. Finally, just before he attempts suicide by driving a truck into a rock, he suddenly sees a pillar of smoke and finds a campsite with a bra on a clothesline. As Phil gleefully sniffs the bra, he passes out and is then revived by an eccentric woman named Carol Pilbasian (Kristen Schaal), whom he talks out of shooting him.
2	2	"The Elephant in the Room"	Phil Lord & Christopher Miller	Andy Bobrow	March 1, 2015	1AYB02	5.75
Carol tries to get Phil to once again respect the rules of civilization so the two can prepare to repopulate the Earth. Since she doesn't believe in premarital sex, Carol convinces Phil to marry her. Phil also attempts to prove himself by finding a way to bring running water back to the cul-de-sac and succeeds when he builds a drip irrigation system for Carol's tomato plants.
3	3	"Raisin Balls and Wedding Bells"	Jason Woliner	Emily Spivey	March 8, 2015	1AYB03	4.35
Phil and Carol's marriage is threatened before it even begins by Phil's lackadaisical attitude, especially when he forgets to bring the rings to their wedding. They then attempt to have sex on their wedding night, but Phil is turned off by Carol's nonstop rambling of phrases she thinks will successfully seduce him. The next day, they run into a limousine driven by Melissa (January Jones), another survivor.
4	4	"Sweet Melissa"	Phil Traill	Liz Cackowski	March 15, 2015	1AYB04	3.76
Phil's attraction to newcomer Melissa makes him reconsider his marriage, so he tries to impress Melissa by shaving his beard, neatly cutting his hair, and finding her a new car since he damaged her limousine. This infuriates Carol, so Phil tries to make amends by fixing the door to Carol's house in the cul-de-sac but injures himself in the process. In the evening, while Carol is making dinner, a drunk Melissa tells Phil she has been longing for a man for two years but knows she can't start a relationship with Phil. Phil, torn between proving his loyalty to Carol and satisfying Melissa, remains unsure of what to tell either of the ladies.
5	5	"Dunk the Skunk"	John Solomon	John Solomon	March 22, 2015	1AYB05	4.55
An ominous figure in an Audi R8 sees one of Phil's "Alive in Tucson" signs and begins driving that way. In Tucson, Phil hopes to manipulate Carol into allowing him to impregnate Melissa, but Carol, who believes in the importance of marriage, sees through his plans when he admits he already told Melissa about this. Phil then tries to atone for his actions by inviting the ladies to drop him in a dunk tank, which neither one does. Finally, Carol agrees that, for the sake of the human race, Phil should try to impregnate both her and Melissa, but Phil's efforts to bed Melissa are stopped short by the arrival of the mysterious driver, who was alerted by Phil's celebratory fireworks and turns out to be an ordinary, nonthreatening man named Todd (Mel Rodriguez).
6	6	"Some Friggin' Fat Dude"	Michael Patrick Jann	Tim McAuliffe	March 22, 2015	1AYB06	4.42
As Todd is welcomed into the group, Carol tries to nudge him and Melissa together, while Phil unsuccessfully attempts to drive them apart. At the end of the day, Phil invites Melissa to the bar where he keeps his sports balls and tries to court her by reading a romantic piece he claims to have written for Carol, but Melissa implicitly rejects his offer.
7	7	"She Drives Me Crazy"	Peter Atencio	David Noel	March 29, 2015	1AYB07	3.40
The knowledge that Todd and Melissa are having sex drives Phil to manic despair, so Phil arranges a community meeting to discuss grievances. However, his plans go awry when everyone instead agrees that he should clean out the pool he has been using as a toilet. The next day, Phil schemes to leave Todd in the desert to die, but his conscience prevents him from doing so. Todd expresses gratitude to Phil for helping him find his way to Tucson, which motivates Phil to finally clean out his toilet pool and bring an outhouse into his home, much to Carol's delight.
8	8	"Mooovin' In"	Claire Scanlon	Liz Cackowski	March 29, 2015	1AYB08	3.33
Phil becomes annoyed at all the attention Todd is receiving and schemes to bring the attention back to himself when he finds a stray cow. To do so, he pretends to steal the cow, but when he really does lose it, Todd eventually finds it and allows Phil to take the credit. That night, the group discovers that the cow has apparently wandered up the stairs of Carol's house and is now stranded, causing Carol to officially move in with Phil. In a brief flashback, Carol is seen purposely bringing the cow upstairs.
9	9	"The Do-Over"	John Solomon	Tim McAuliffe	April 12, 2015	1AYB09	3.22
Phil is out shopping at Carol's request when he starts sincerely resenting his marriage and begs God for a "do-over". Almost immediately afterwards, a car appears and two women, Erica (Cleopatra Coleman) and Gail (Mary Steenburgen), emerge. Phil tells the women he is a widower, gives a fake surname, and claims he hasn't met anyone else who is alive. The three have dinner and drinks, but when they are on their way to skinny dip in a lake, they run into Carol, Todd, and Melissa.
10	10	"Pranks for Nothin'"	Chris Koch	Emily Spivey	April 12, 2015	1AYB10	3.37
Everyone is mad at Phil for lying as they refuse to speak to Phil, and he is shunned. Carol also holds a grudge against Erica and Gail. Phil confronts the group and tells the truth about various issues, including the fact that he never wanted to marry Carol. Carol, who is a notary, divorces Phil, then forgives him and invites him back to the cul-de-sac.
11	11	"Moved to Tampa"	Jason Woliner	Erik Durbin	April 19, 2015	1AYB11	3.41
Phil's post-divorce romantic prospects are very bright as both Gail and Erica are interested in him now that he is "single". To prevent any other men from showing up, Phil starts changing his billboard messages from "Alive in Tucson" to "Moved to Tampa", but his ladder falls while he is working on his first sign, leaving him stranded. A new, handsome man (Boris Kodjoe) arrives and rescues Phil, driving him home. To everyone's surprise, the new man, a U.S. Army Special Forces veteran and one-time building contractor, is also named Phil Miller. Confusion over having two Phils causes a competition that the original Phil loses. As a result, he is now to be known by his middle name, "Tandy".
12	12	"The Tandyman Can"	Claire Scanlon	Matt Marshall	April 26, 2015	1AYB12	3.29
Tensions heat up between the new Phil and Tandy to the point where the group chooses the new Phil, who has been using his construction skills to make numerous improvements around the cul-de-sac, as the new POTUS. Tandy then decides to plant his own farm to win back the ladies' favor, disregarding Phil's insistence that Tucson's climate is too arid to grow food. The new Phil's presence also puts a strain on Todd's and Melissa's relationship. Meanwhile, the three other ladies all try to woo the new Phil, with recently-divorced Carol winning him over. These events cause Tandy and Todd to set aside their differences and plot to murder Phil.
13	13	"Screw the Moon"	John Solomon	Erik Durbin & John Solomon	May 3, 2015	1AYB13	3.51
Tandy purposely knocks over a lamp that Phil has powered using solar energy, so Phil, who is tired of Tandy's antics and had recently overheard his plans to kill him, orders Tandy to leave Tucson, but Tandy seeks refuge in his bedroom for several days. When Carol invites Tandy to come out of hiding, he finds everyone except Phil singing together around the community fire pit to forgive him, but Phil attacks him and leaves him in the desert with limited supplies, threatening to kill him if he returns to Tucson. Carol drives out in search of Tandy and decides to stay with him so they can start a new life together somewhere other than Tucson. As they reintroduce themselves, Tandy mentions he has a brother (Jason Sudeikis), who is shown to be still alive and stranded in the International Space Station.

=== Season 2 (2015–16) ===
No. overall	No. in season	Title	Directed by	Written by	Original release date	Prod. code	U.S. viewers (millions)
14	1	"Is There Anybody Out There?"	John Solomon	David Noel & John Solomon	September 27, 2015	2AYB01	3.14
Tandy and Carol have now been away from Tucson for about six months and gone on their own road trip in Tandy's RV across the United States, even stopping at Carol's old apartment on the East Coast. At first, Tandy is reluctant to return because of his banishment. However, when he decides to take the risk for Carol, who is pining for their friends, she refuses to go back, even at Tandy's suggestion. Tandy slips drugs in her evening wine, and when she awakens, she realizes they are well on their way to Tucson and begins sulking. At a gas stop in Oklahoma, a still sulking Carol quietly slips out of the RV. Tandy, thinking Carol is still in the RV, leaves without her. He then searches for her and reluctantly returns to Tucson, hoping she might be there, only to find the whole cul-de-sac abandoned and his house burned. In space, Tandy's astronaut brother Mike searches for human life through a telescope and tends to his pet worms, two of whom die.
15	2	"The Boo"	Jason Woliner	Andy Bobrow	October 4, 2015	2AYB02	3.30
Tandy successfully sends a message to Carol via train that he is in Tucson. He finds a letter from Melissa in Carol's old house asking her to join the rest of the group in Malibu but telling her not to bring Tandy because it would be too dangerous. He initially hides the letter from Carol but then tells the truth, and she decides she will not go to Malibu if Tandy isn't welcome there. Tandy gets her drunk and drives to Malibu with her anyway. On their way, they discover several dead whales on the beach. They eventually find the group and look from a distance, where they see another man, Gordon (Will Ferrell), with them. When Carol surprises them, Gordon is shocked and has a fatal heart attack as a camouflaged Tandy watches through binoculars.
16	3	"Dead Man Walking"	John Solomon	Erik Durbin	October 11, 2015	2AYB03	2.70
The survivors deliver eulogies for the recently deceased Gordon, in whose mansion they now live. Carol tells them that Tandy had died too and feigns mourning. When no one shows sympathy for Tandy, Carol tells the group that Tandy is actually alive. Tandy is torn between pretending he does not care about the group's opinion of him and honestly wanting to make amends with them despite his fears of rejection. Knowing he should apologize, Tandy walks into the house and tries to convince the others that he has changed, but he does so while holding the group at gunpoint and threatening them if they decide to attack again. Carol tells him that the group was planning to forgive him, but because of his threats, Tandy is soon locked in a pillory as punishment and is told he will remain there until the group decides otherwise.
17	4	"C to the T"	Matt Villines & Oz Rodriguez	Emily Spivey	October 18, 2015	2AYB04	2.29
Carol tells the others that locking Tandy in a pillory is an uncivilized form of punishment. The group then decides to put Tandy in solitary confinement in the exercise room of the mansion for a week. However, Tandy, feeling that he deserves to "do the time" for threatening the others, insists that the punishment last five weeks. One night, Tandy attempts to steal some cheese and is punished by being forced to wear a shock collar and to stay on the lawn with the group's cow. Over the next few days, Tandy ends up wearing a more dangerous shock collar triggered by his talking aloud and being locked in a metal booth for throwing potted plants to get attention. Later, Tandy breaks out of his booth through the floor when he spots a fire from a fallen torch, which he extinguishes with buckets of water despite being shocked dozens of times. Although his punishment is rescinded, only Carol shows sympathy for Tandy, and when he thanks the other survivors for his release, they walk away.
18	5	"Crickets"	Jason Woliner	Tim McAuliffe	October 25, 2015	2AYB05	3.36
The group discovers live crickets, which Carol cooks up into disgusting stew. Tandy investigates Todd, who hasn't been eating any crickets, after watching him sneak into a neighboring house. He finds that the house has solar power and a freezer full of bacon Todd has been keeping for himself. Instead of telling on him, Tandy has Todd share the bacon with him, then tries to convince Todd to share the last three bacon packets with everyone else. After Todd refuses, Tandy takes the bacon to the group and praises Todd for sharing it. Tandy tries to dispose of the bacon packets he and Todd emptied by sending them out to sea on a jet ski, which finds its way back to the beach. As Todd attempts to tell the truth, Tandy lies to defend Todd, but both are locked in pillories, where they mend their friendship. Meanwhile, tension builds up between Carol and Erica as Phil frequently hits on Carol, making Erica resentful of her, but they reconcile after Erica calls out Phil's behavior.
19	6	"A Real Live Wire"	Jason Woliner	Erica Rivinoja	November 8, 2015	2AYB06	2.57
With Phil on strike from doing work, Tandy and Todd decide to solve the group's power crisis themselves by putting up solar panels, but they cannot find out how to stop a live wire from sparking dangerously around the area. Tandy reluctantly asks Phil for help, only to have Phil punch him upon mentioning Carol. Meanwhile, Carol attempts to convince the other ladies in the group to try to have babies, but each refuses for various reasons. In the end, everyone takes Tandy's side and suggests Phil take a turn in the pillory, but Phil chooses to leave after he shows them an on/off switch to the solar panels. Before he departs, however, he professes his love for Carol and begs her to leave with him, only to have Erica announce that she is pregnant.
20	7	"Baby Steps"	John Solomon	Matt Marshall	November 15, 2015	2AYB07	2.84
Phil attempts to apologize to Erica for his misdeeds despite his being treated as the new outcast. On Carol's advice, Tandy attempts to take advantage of Phil's new status and make the group feel sympathy for him. Although everyone now hates Phil, Tandy feels some empathy after seeing Phil build some wooden toys and a crib for Erica's future baby, then suggests that Phil take his turn in the pillory to seek forgiveness. Angered, Phil instead states that he resents saving Tandy from dying atop a billboard and that everyone is worse off for knowing him. That night, Phil drinks heavily and passes out on the beach. As the tide rises, Tandy uses a surfboard to drag Phil back to the mansion, where he locks the still-unconscious Phil in the pillory. Meanwhile, Melissa and Todd argue when he finds out that she was previously going to have children with Tandy to help repopulate the Earth but is now unwilling to do the same with him. At the same time, Carol helps Erica with her new pregnancy while lamenting her inability to have children with Tandy.
21	8	"No Bull"	Payman Benz	Liz Cackowski	November 22, 2015	2AYB08	3.27
After the cow gives birth, the group believes that there is a bull somewhere and decides to search for it. Thinking Phil could earn forgiveness from the group, Tandy releases him from the pillory, but Phil leaves Malibu for Canada instead of helping in the search. Tandy then tries to have everybody stop looking for the bull and start looking for Phil, but the group members verbally attack each other, especially when Tandy describes how all of them, like him and Phil, are imperfect. The next morning, a bull indeed shows up on the mansion's back porch, and the group rapidly shoots tranquilizers at it, accidentally killing it. Phil, who found the bull, arrives and joins everyone for a beef dinner, having regained the group's trust. Meanwhile, Todd accidentally catches Gail with a Gordon mannequin and tries to refrain from mentioning it. They then start their own relationship after he and Melissa officially break up. In space, Mike fixes a broken radio and becomes excited when he hears a possible signal from Earth, only to realize it is simply an echo of his own signal. Disappointed, he gets high from inhaling nitrous oxide.
22	9	"Secret Santa"	Nick Jasenovec	Kira Kalush	December 6, 2015	2AYB09	3.58
With Christmas quickly approaching, Carol organizes a Secret Santa gift exchange for the entire group. Tandy receives Erica's name but gives it to Phil so that he can give a gift to regain Erica's trust. Tandy then gives Phil the Hope Diamond as a possible gift for Erica, but he rejects it, stating he has his own ideas, which annoys Tandy. On Christmas Day, everyone exchanges gifts with Phil being the last to present his. Phil reveals that he has prepared an ultrasound scan for Erica, impressing everyone except Tandy, who is irritated that Phil rejected his gift idea but still accepts his invitation for celebratory drinks. Later in the evening, Melissa proposes to Todd. Before Todd can answer, Phil collapses. Meanwhile, in space, Mike Miller's last worm dies, so he decides to commit suicide by opening the airlock and releasing himself into space. At the last moment, however, he sees a newborn worm and tries to abort the opening of the airlock. This fails, and he is launched into space.
23	10	"Silent Night"	Jason Woliner	Tim McAuliffe	December 13, 2015	2AYB10	3.16
Phil has a severe case of appendicitis, which the group learns will kill him if they cannot remove his appendix. They choose Gail to perform the operation, and she reluctantly agrees as long as she can practice on something. Finding no viable bodies in a local morgue, Tandy and Todd decide to dig up the recently deceased Gordon. As they drag Gordon's body to Gail, they see she has found a medical dummy to practice on, so they quickly re-bury the body. In space, Mike Miller succeeds in reentering the space station since his suit is still tethered to it. Once inside, he tells his newborn worm friend "Phil" he has decided to return to Earth. Gail and Todd begin operating on Phil, but soon encounter complications. As Mike's reentry capsule begins tumbling upon reentry into Earth's atmosphere, Phil flatlines.
24	11	"Pitch Black"	John Solomon	David Noel & John Solomon	March 6, 2016	2AYB11	2.72
Mike's reentry capsule parachutes into a weathered cruise ship, sinking it, but Mike escapes on an aqua-cycle with his worm. After three days of wandering the sea, he encounters a yacht. On board, he is cornered by Pat Brown (Mark Boone Junior), a grizzled sailor who threatens him with a harpoon gun, fearing that Mike could be carrying the virus. Mike defends himself by explaining his arrival from space, then convinces Pat to take them ashore to find supplies. In the morning, they don decontamination suits and go to Miami, Florida, where they visit a deserted virus triage operation and play some tennis. On the drive back, Mike sees an "Alive in Tucson" sign and suggests going there, but Pat knocks him unconscious, believing the sign is part of a government conspiracy to trap survivors. When Mike regains consciousness, he fights over a gun with Pat, who again knocks him unconscious and notices a rip in Mike's suit. Thinking he has exposed Mike to the virus, Pat abandons him in the triage operation. Mike soon wakes up again, takes off his suit, and starts driving an ambulance to Tucson.
25	12	"Valhalla"	Payman Benz	Erica Rivinoja	March 13, 2016	2AYB12	2.56
The group holds a Norse funeral for Phil by sending his casket out to sea on a makeshift Viking vessel. Tandy mourns losing Phil, as he was making amends with Phil just before he died. He seeks closure by rummaging through Phil's possessions and learns that, despite Phil's claim he had no middle name, his middle name was Stacy. He then offers to help raise Erica's baby, but she tells him Phil's last request was to keep him away from doing so. Outraged, Tandy tries to fool Erica into thinking Phil was more morally loose than he actually was. When he fails, he builds a fire that night to burn Phil's possessions. Suddenly, Phil's casket washes up on shore, and Erica catches Tandy grieving beside it. After they bury the casket in the sand, Erica helps Tandy find closure. Meanwhile, Tandy tells Carol that Todd and Gail have been seeing each other, but he warns Carol against telling Melissa. Following Todd's apology to Gail for not telling Melissa the truth, Melissa attempts to win back Todd, kissing him without Gail's knowledge. When Melissa announces this to Carol, Carol confronts Todd and shames him before giving him a kiss of death.
26	13	"Fish in the Dish"	Jared Hess	Liz Cackowski	April 3, 2016	2AYB13	2.11
Carol decides to figure out why she and Tandy haven't been able to have children. Tandy's fertility tests reveal that he has a low sperm count, which may prevent him from having a family. However, he lies to Carol and tells her the tests are expired, then uses one of Todd's tests, which is positive, as his own. At the same time, Todd tries to reconcile his relationships with both Melissa and Gail, but things become more complicated when Erica reveals that the late Phil chose him as a surrogate father for her baby. As Tandy and Todd are both angry at themselves, they agree to tell all the ladies the truth. Before they can, Carol notices Mike Miller arriving on the beach, so Tandy runs towards him. To everyone's surprise, as Mike tries to hug Tandy, Tandy punches him in the groin.
27	14	"Skidmark"	Claire Scanlon	Kira Kalush & Matt Marshall	April 10, 2016	2AYB14	2.70
The Miller brothers break out in a fist fight on the beach, then tearfully apologize when Mike tells Tandy how he thought fondly of him in space. Mike joins everyone for dinner, explains how he found his way to Malibu, and tells stories about life with Tandy. When they were younger, Mike gave Tandy an embarrassing nickname: "Skidmark", a reference to Tandy's bygone habit of accidentally dirtying his underwear after using toilets. Furthermore, when the brothers last spoke to one another, Tandy had found out his former crush Christine was cheating on him with Mike. Sibling rivalry resurfaces when Mike receives all the attention at a bonfire on the beach the next night. This provokes Tandy to throw a party of his own the night after and point out Mike's flaws, humiliating his brother. Carol tells Tandy that he shouldn't be treating Mike so harshly, as Tandy is the only survivor with a confirmed living relative, so Tandy plans to apologize in the morning. When he wakes up the next day, he realizes that Mike shaved the entire right half of his body and head while he was asleep. Meanwhile, Melissa and Gail eventually agree to simultaneously date Todd.
28	15	"Fourth Finger"	Jason Woliner	Erik Durbin	April 17, 2016	2AYB15	2.52
Tandy and Mike's prank war escalates, with Mike staying consistently one step ahead of Tandy. Tandy becomes paranoid, so he welcomes Todd's offer to help him get back at Mike. Todd shaves half his entire body and head to show his support for Tandy. Fearing the consequences of bringing others into the prank war, Mike promises to stop his share of the pranks. Tandy thinks he is lying, so he writes a pretend letter from their mother from when the apocalypse began. Mike is heartbroken by this prank, so Tandy makes peace by giving him a collection of real letters, and the brothers tell each other how their parents were proud of them both. As Tandy walks out the door of Mike's new home, a bucket of flour falls on him, which upsets him despite Mike's pleading that he didn't expect Tandy's apology. Meanwhile, Todd continues to stress over the increased involvement with Gail and Melissa, which culminates in him addressing all the women, explaining that he can give his fullest efforts to each of them, including Carol and Erica. In the end, Carol approaches Todd with a surprise request to impregnate her.
29	16	"Falling Slowly"	David Noel	David Noel & John Solomon	April 24, 2016	2AYB16	2.13
Carol tells Tandy about her asking Todd to impregnate her, detailing how she wants to briefly marry him so they can have a legitimate child, but Tandy is concerned because he has not yet told Carol he loves her. During Todd and Carol's wedding on the beach, Tandy objects to the marriage and insists that Mike marry Carol instead. Feeling betrayed by Tandy, Todd shaves the remaining half of his head and face. That night, fearing that he may never have a chance to tell Carol the truth, Tandy begs Mike to let him watch him try to impregnate Carol. As he ultimately joins his brother and wife in bed, he finally tells Carol he loves her. In the morning, Tandy feels ashamed for ruining Mike and Carol's night, while Carol discards an ovulation test, which Erica finds out is actually a positive pregnancy test. Mike concludes that the future child must be Tandy's, so everyone celebrates. Later that day, while on the lawn, a drunk Gail notices a UAV flying ominously overhead.
30	17	"Smart and Stupid"	Payman Benz	Emily Spivey	May 8, 2016	2AYB17	2.21
Gail tries to report seeing the UAV that was hovering over the lawn, but, due to her poor description and consistent drunkenness, no one believes her. With Tandy and Carol happily celebrating the latter's pregnancy, Todd, feeling heartbroken, tells Tandy he is angry that Tandy chose Mike over him as a sperm donor for Carol. Meanwhile, Mike starts dating Erica and learns that she was wrongfully imprisoned for armed bank robbery before getting a job at the U.S. State Department under an assumed name. The next day, while Mike is tending to the cows, Tandy asks him to be the godfather to his future baby. Todd confronts Tandy again, but their fight is interrupted when Mike coughs up blood, a sign of the virus. Tandy believes his brother is only suffering from a non-life-threatening disease, but that night, Mike is asked to sleep in a quarantined bed. Mike's worries then heighten when Melissa announces that the mother cow has died. The group pushes Mike's bubble out of the house, but Tandy chooses to sleep beside him. The following morning, Tandy realizes that Mike has disappeared and left a note saying goodbye.
31	18	"30 Years of Science Down the Tubes"	John Solomon	Edward Voccola & Maxwell R. Kessler	May 15, 2016	2AYB18	2.23
Tandy drives to his childhood home in Tucson, where, on his arrival, Mike pranks him by feigning death. Over the day, Mike ruins Tandy's experiment to see if a bottled fart still smells after 30 years, falls for Tandy's virus-themed prank, and cuts the remaining half of Tandy's hair and beard. Tandy insists on staying, but Mike, wanting him to leave, lashes out at him and calls him a loser, then learns Tandy buried their parents in the backyard and made a grave for him. Finally, Mike tells Tandy it is his "dying wish" that he leave, and Tandy agrees. As a parting gift, Mike gives Tandy a new bottled fart, and Tandy gives Mike his sports balls before returning to Malibu, where everyone sees the drone Gail saw before. When it passes by again, the survivors hold up signs of welcome and peace until Melissa destroys it with a shotgun. That night, Melissa is awakened by what she thinks is an intruder and almost shoots Carol, so she is locked in the pillory. The next day, Gail sees Pat Brown's yacht. Through binoculars, Tandy sees Pat and two others approaching in an inflatable dinghy, all carrying assault rifles and dressed in decontamination suits.

=== Season 3 (2016–17) ===
No. overall	No. in season	Title	Directed by	Written by	Original release date	Prod. code	U.S. viewers (millions)
32	1	"General Breast Theme with Cobras"	John Solomon	David Noel & John Solomon	September 25, 2016	3AYB01	2.23
Pat and his crew land on the shores of Malibu. Tandy and company attempt to escape using their cars, but Todd's van from The A-Team is blocking the way and he can't find the keys. They try to hide, but are quickly discovered and, in the ensuing chaos, Melissa shoots Darrell (Jon Hamm), one of the crew members, and the other two surrender. Following Darrell's funeral, Tandy convinces his friends to allow the two, Pat and Lewis (Kenneth Choi), into their group. Tandy and Pat initially bond when Pat demonstrates his designer jean artwork. Meanwhile, the others persuade Lewis to confess that Pat is delusional and has killed a person. After Tandy and Pat return from shelling the Santa Monica Pier, Pat thanks everyone for accepting him. He then notices Tandy's family photo and, recognizing Mike, accuses Tandy of carrying the virus and threatens to kill him, but his gun jams and Tandy's group and Lewis flee and drive off in Todd's van. As Pat tries to block their way and shoots at the van, Todd runs over him and thinks he has killed him.
33	2	"The Wild Guess Express"	Peter Atencio	Andy Bobrow	October 2, 2016	3AYB02	2.50
The survivors flee to a mansion once owned by Cher, who had died inside. Tandy goes to see if Pat is still alive, but Pat remains motionless, so Tandy dumps him by a heap of garbage. When Tandy informs the group about Pat, Todd is overcome with remorse for killing him, so Tandy tells him Pat is really still alive, and then creates a false crime scene to make it look like Pat stormed the Malibu mansion. A conversation with Todd and the others confuses everyone as to whether Pat is alive or dead until Tandy states that he is alive, causing a panic. While he and Carol are alone, Tandy explains that Pat is truly dead, so they stage a brawl between Tandy and a Pat mannequin with Tandy emerging victorious. The others can see through this ruse, so Lewis demands Tandy tell the truth. Tandy tells him Pat is dead, so everyone but Lewis gives Todd a group hug. As the survivors return to the Malibu mansion, Carol notices Pat's yacht has disappeared, and when they visit where Tandy put Pat's body, they find it's no longer there.
34	3	"You're All Going to Diet"	Jason Woliner	Tim McAuliffe	October 16, 2016	3AYB03	2.66
The survivors follow a trail of blood from where Tandy hid Pat's body to the beach. Tandy predicts Pat's fear of the virus means he may never return to harm them, but, in case he does return, Tandy sets up an alarm system with novelty singing fish animatronics. He also decides to teach the group self-defense but tasers and infuriates Lewis. That night, Erica accidentally sets off the fishes, causing mayhem. Carol, who has redecorated the house to cover up Tandy's pretend crime scene, asks everyone to wear whistles, and Melissa sets up self-defense "stations" with axes embedded in the walls. Tandy and Lewis make amends while playing football on the beach, but they set off one of the land mines Melissa buried under the sand. Lewis suggests everyone leave despite Tandy's belief that Malibu is the group's home. When the ocean waves set off the land mines, and car alarms and Melissa's shooting outside result in chaos, the survivors agree to leave Malibu. Before leaving, they pack their belongings and say goodbye to both their deceased group members and Cher.
35	4	"Five Hoda Kotbs"	David Noel	Emily Spivey	October 23, 2016	3AYB04	2.14
The survivors continue their search for a new home in several vehicles, which break down or are lost one by one. Carol suggests going to San Francisco, but when they arrive, they find it burned because Tandy set fire to a fireworks factory two years ago. As the group continues traveling, they become annoyed by each other quickly: after Lewis tells the others he is gay, Tandy is unable to drop the subject and irritates Lewis with dreadful singing. Meanwhile, Todd and Gail fight over whether or not Gail is done grieving over the late Gordon, and Carol and Erica argue about their pregnancies and the air conditioning in their car, which then overheats. Everyone joins Todd in the A-Team van until it breaks down, so they all join Tandy in his prison bus until it runs out of fuel. Continuing on foot to an abandoned patio furniture store in San Jose, California, the group argues over where to live next until Gail declares she wants to move to Napa alone. As Tandy and Todd try to persuade Gail to stay, Melissa calls the survivors over to where she sees a brilliant light. When they investigate, they discover an illuminated building.
36	5	"The Power of Power"	Peter Atencio	Matt Marshall	November 6, 2016	3AYB05	2.13
The survivors move into a self-sustaining but never completely finished office building. Tandy gives everyone different floors to live on, and the survivors enjoy their numerous electricity-based luxuries until the power suddenly goes out. Tandy checks the fuse box and experiments with flipping switches until the power comes back on. He then stops an art display from falling on Carol, notices a wire cutter nearby, and suspects that Lewis, who was at first uncertain about living in the office, cut the power. He goes out of his way to get Lewis to confess until Carol admits that she cut the power because she had hoped to raise her family in a normal home. She insists on being locked in a pillory as punishment, after which Tandy moves his wife into a mock home of her dreams. Meanwhile, Gail breaks up with Todd as he is taking a fire sprinkler shower, so he talks things out with Tandy before telling this news to Melissa, who has been acting strangely lately for having killed Darrell. Melissa starts feeling emotion for Todd until she scares him when she burns all her shirts and announces she is ready to have children with him.
37	6	"The Open-Ended Nature of Unwitnessed Deaths"	John Solomon	Liz Cackowski	November 13, 2016	3AYB06	2.64
Tandy seeks to rebuild trust with Lewis. As they get to know each other more, Lewis tells Tandy that he last saw Mark, his partner, board a plane to Tokyo. When the virus broke out and grounded all flights, Mark had planned to travel to the U.S. by boat. Tandy forces Lewis to go to Seattle to see if Mark made it home. In his former house, Lewis finds no trace of Mark, then opens a bottle of wine that he and Mark were saving for their anniversary. Though Lewis walks away angrily, Tandy says there is always hope. Lewis leaves a note for Mark, "Just in case", then drives with Tandy to Tucson to see if Mike is alive. Tandy chooses to not enter Mike's room and instead leaves a note, taking his old volleyball "Gary" with him. In San Jose, Carol decides that she needs a mother and her baby needs a grandmother, so she asks Gail to adopt her. After much emotion, thought, and discussion, Gail reveals she had a child who had died before the virus, but then signs home-made adoption papers and adopts Carol. Also, Todd is concerned about Melissa, who continues to act strangely.
38	7	"Mama's Hideaway"	Payman Benz	Kira Kalush	November 20, 2016	3AYB07	2.04
Carol wants to take the perfect family photo with Tandy and Gail, but Gail refuses because of Carol's various matching outfits. After sabotaging a photo by closing her eyes, Gail retreats to her "hideout", where Carol finds her and brings her alcoholism into the fact. Meanwhile, Melissa, carrying a toy infant like a real baby, breaks up with Todd because he does not want a child with her. She then asks Tandy to impregnate her, but a flattered Tandy declines and soon learns that she also asked Lewis, who has been teaching himself aviation so he can fly to Tokyo and see if Mark is alive. Another power outage during a flight simulation causes Tandy and Lewis to discover four other self-sustaining buildings in the complex, and they unknowingly trap Gail in one of the new buildings' elevators while tampering with the power. That evening, Carol, who wants to apologize, calls Tandy, Erica, and Lewis to search for Gail. Todd interrupts and tells them that Melissa has run away and left a note saying goodbye.
39	8	"Whitney Houston, We Have a Problem"	David Noel	Tim McAuliffe & David Noel	December 4, 2016	3AYB08	2.48
The five remaining survivors begin searching for Melissa. Gail fires her gun to get Tandy's attention just as he honks his car's horn to get Carol's, blocking out the fire. At the end of the day, everyone calls off the search except Todd, who spends all night looking for Melissa and falls asleep in the shower the next day. Tandy promises to help him in his search, while Carol asks Tandy to help her find Gail. Tandy then admits that Gail most likely disappeared because of Carol's behavior, so Carol decides Gail does not want to be found and rejoins the search for Melissa with Tandy and Todd. Before leaving, they see a pizza delivery car near a liquor store that resembles one in the complex. Meanwhile, Gail tries to pry open the elevator doors and ultimately uses her Gordon mannequin's head, which opens the doors to a solid wall with a small opening leading to one of the building's floors. When Tandy, Carol, and Todd return to the building where Gail parked her delivery car without their knowledge, Gail fires her gun once again to get attention, but as they approach the building, Melissa appears with a gun, and they depart thinking she fired the shots.
40	9	"If You're Happy and You Know It"	Jason Woliner	Erik Durbin & Will Forte	December 11, 2016	3AYB09	2.21
Carol is upset by Gail's absence, so Tandy decides to take her on a honeymoon they never had. As they realize how their pre-apocalyptic civilization is truly gone, they discover a live catfish, but are horrified when they subsequently find it lying on the ground seemingly lifeless. When the fish suddenly comes back to life, an overjoyed Carol and Tandy bring "Gail" back to the office building as a pet. Lewis and Erica continue working on the flight simulator and are ecstatic when Lewis successfully completes a flight sequence, moving him closer to his goal of flying to Tokyo to find Mark. The group tries talking to Melissa, but she does not seem to remember acting strangely. Todd then finds her standing on the edge of the roof on the tallest building and reluctantly locks her in a focus room, where she screams at him from inside. In the powerless building's elevator, after Gail's attempt to put a rescue note on a stray robotic vacuum cleaner fails, in anger she shoots several times at the ceiling but is accidentally hit by a ricochet. She then loads the last bullet from the box, and a single flash and gunshot are seen and heard from outside.
41	10	"Got Milk?"	John Solomon	Maxwell R. Kessler	March 5, 2017	3AYB18	2.19
In the first year of the virus outbreak, Pamela Brinton (Kristen Wiig) and her husband Benjamin (Timothy V. Murphy) are wealthy socialites. As an auction at Pamela's foundation that saves dogs begins, a party guest named Leonard catches the virus. The next day, Pamela's friend Catherine (Laura Dern) and her husband Robert purchase a new underground bunker, while Pamela fears the worst upon learning her maid Christina, as well as President Mike Pence and his successors, have died. Benjamin soon catches the virus, too, so Pamela escapes with her dog Jeremy to Catherine's house and finds her dead. She then leaves for Catherine's bunker and, over time, bonds with Jeremy and celebrates various holidays. Using a surveillance drone, she investigates life on the outside. Three years later, the drone spots Tandy's group in Malibu, but it stops working when Melissa shoots it (which was depicted at the end of the second season). Pamela chooses to go above ground.
42	11	"The Spirit of St. Lewis"	John Solomon	Liz Cackowski & John Solomon	March 12, 2017	3AYB10	2.04
The survivors take turns talking to Melissa, who plays hurtful mind games with each of them. Erica researches new ways to help Melissa with her condition, Todd installs a baby video monitor in her room, and Tandy tries giving her pills before Todd dismisses the idea, as none of the survivors is a doctor. Lewis celebrates completing his flight training with Tandy, who surprises him with a real airplane and convinces him he is ready to fly an actual plane despite the group's worries for him. However, Lewis crashes very soon after take off and dies. Tandy then delivers a eulogy for Lewis and tries to spread his ashes using a drone, which crashes into a tree and falls into a lake. In a church, Tandy asks God to tell Lewis his apologies and expresses his desire to help the group however he can. He suddenly has an epiphany and lights the front of the group's main building with a rainbow pattern in Lewis's honor. Though Tandy fails to lift his friends' spirits, his installation of the lights causes the power to return to the building where Gail is stranded. The elevator door opens, and Gail's fingers are briefly seen moving.
43	12	"Hair of the Dog"	Payman Benz	Edward Voccola	March 19, 2017	3AYB11	1.97
Gail escapes the elevator, reunites with the main group, and passes out briefly before reviving and learning about Lewis' and Melissa's fates. Todd decides to go to Melissa's hometown of Akron, Ohio with Tandy and Melissa to investigate her situation. Once there, Melissa gives them a fake address, allowing her to escape. The men soon find a billboard advertising the real estate agency where Melissa worked. From there, they locate Melissa's real house and find her asleep in bed. In the morning, Melissa takes a mysterious pill at breakfast, so she, Todd, and Tandy return to San Jose with questions about the pill. Meanwhile, Carol tries mending her recently formed relationship with Gail, which culminates in retaking their family photo. Carol is alerted when she sees a masked figure lurking in the background of the photo.
44	13	"Find This Thing We Need To"	Steve Day	Erik Durbin & Tim McAuliffe	March 26, 2017	3AYB12	1.97
Carol shows the group photos of the figure in a Yoda mask she saw. She takes Tandy and Erica to search for "Yoda", and they find a house filled with children's toys and drawings of Tandy and Carol's honeymoon. Tandy states that they should leave the place undisturbed but barrel rolls out of their disguised car and waits all night, urging "Yoda" to return and sensing a young version of himself in the child. Carol and Erica arrive in the morning to take a frustrated and cold Tandy back to the office, only for "Yoda" to spring up behind them in the car. Meanwhile, Todd asks Melissa about her unidentified tablet, but she keeps stating, "Santa's penis". He and Gail try to match the pill with other samples at a pharmacy until Gail drops and loses it, angering Todd. On the drive back, Gail reminds Todd to rescue her mannequin from the elevator where she was trapped. Seeing what Gail experienced there, Todd apologizes for overly focusing on Melissa and fixes Gail's Gordon mannequin. Later, Gail notices a medicine labeled "Clozapine", which resembles Melissa's and has a matching effect.
45	14	"Point Person Knows Best"	Maggie Carey	Jeff Vanderkruik	April 2, 2017	3AYB13	1.74
The group tries talking to the newcomer "Yoda", who does not speak but takes off his mask to eat some pizza and turns out to be a preadolescent boy. Tandy names him "Jasper" after his JanSport backpack and tries bonding with him, but Jasper remains silent and either ignores or dismisses Tandy's increasingly manic attempts to be his friend. Tandy shocks the group when he bonds with Jasper by offering him cigarettes. He agrees to let Jasper pick a parental figure but is left in tears when Jasper chooses Erica. Carol consoles Tandy, who is worried that their own child will hate him, and Erica kindly lets him say goodnight to a sleeping Jasper before he takes from the child a patched-up "Gary" the volleyball, whom Erica trampled earlier. Elsewhere, Carol is suspicious when she sees Todd put a friendly hand on Gail's shoulder as they discuss Melissa's recovery, and she repeatedly confronts Gail about tempting Todd to cheat on Melissa until Gail tells her to stay out of her business with him.
46	15	"Name 20 Picnics... Now!"	David Noel	Matt Marshall	April 23, 2017	3AYB14	1.73
The survivors discuss how Jasper has never been exposed to birthdays or major holidays, so they plan a party to celebrate every major holiday. Todd thinks this may help Melissa, but Tandy, who believes Jasper was recently frightened by Melissa wandering for seemingly no reason, refuses to let the boy near her. Their disagreement worsens when Tandy catches Todd trying to set up a picnic for Melissa and Jasper. Todd gets drunk on the night of the party to calm down, then approaches Tandy and Jasper to admit to the boy that something is wrong with Melissa. Before the men can start a fist fight, they hear police sirens and find out Melissa and Jasper are pranking them. Todd, having not seen Melissa so happy for a long time, apologizes to Tandy as a shooting star passes by and turns out to be a satellite, which crashes into a shopping plaza. Elsewhere, Erica gets her baby bump, which makes Carol jealous and concerned that she might not get hers until Erica reassures her otherwise.
47	16	"The Big Day"	Nisha Ganatra	Erica Rivinoja	April 30, 2017	3AYB15	1.96
Six months after the holiday party, Erica and Carol are both visibly pregnant; Jasper is now speaking, showing himself to be annoyed by Tandy's antics; Melissa has regained her sanity and she and Todd get married; and Erica and Gail have become a romantic couple. Todd's "re-virginization" process tests Melissa's nerves because she wants to have sex with him right away during their wedding reception. Tandy is thrilled about the arrival of Carol's first child, but Gail's increasing insistence that she should deliver the baby puts her at odds with Tandy as she tells him that Carol also wants her to do so. Finally, Tandy tells Carol he wanted to deliver the baby because of how helpless he felt when the late Phil (Stacy) died and how he loves Carol too much to bear it. Carol says that Tandy will play the most important role in delivering their baby: holding her hand. Gail tells Tandy he can assist her assistant Todd at the birth of Carol's child. Erica announces that her water has broken.
48	17	"When the Going Gets Tough"	Payman Benz	Tim McAuliffe	May 7, 2017	3AYB16	1.76
Erica goes into labor with Gail and Todd preparing to deliver her baby. Carol becomes scared of childbirth and fears dying due to Erica's loud and painful screams. Erica passes out from a lack of oxygen, but Todd resuscitates her with smelling salts. Gail and Todd soon discover they have to manually turn the baby into the correct position. With the help of Melissa and a now-confident Carol, they move the baby to the right position, and Erica gives birth to a girl she names Dawn. Meanwhile, Tandy is kicked out of the makeshift delivery room as he is still forbidden from helping Erica raise her baby, so he takes Jasper to a water park, where Jasper expresses his worries that Erica may die. After Tandy assures him that she will be fine, they discover a distant fire and find out it is a melting nuclear power plant.
49	18	"Nature's Horchata"	David Noel	Kira Kalush	May 7, 2017	3AYB17	1.84
Knowing the immediate danger of radioactive fallout from the burning nuclear power plant, the group leaves the office building in an RV, but not before cleaning up Lewis' last remains, forgetting their calf, and attaching Carol's makeshift house to the trailer. They stop at a library to figure out where to go. Since the United States is covered with nuclear plants, they begin traveling to Mexico. While Todd drives, Tandy annoys Erica by continually observing her difficulty with getting baby Dawn to nurse. Tandy's Geiger counter sets off as they get closer to Tijuana, so they return to the Los Angeles area to instead use a boat to flee to Mexico, hoping to avoid Pat Brown along the way. In L.A., Carol's makeshift house catches fire, due to Tandy placing candles in her house to calm her nerves, sending off a huge plume of black smoke. Pat sees the smoke and follows them to a marina. On the boat, Erica finally breastfeeds Dawn. Tandy gives a celebratory speech long enough for Pat to arrive with a shotgun. Before pulling the trigger, he is shot by Pamela Brinton, who introduces herself to the group.

=== Season 4 (2017–18) ===
No. overall	No. in season	Title	Directed by	Written by	Original release date	Prod. code	U.S. viewers (millions)
50	1	"M.U.B.A.R."	John Solomon	Rich Blomquist & John Solomon	October 1, 2017	4AYB01	2.28
Pamela introduces herself to the group, explaining that she had met Pat in Malibu and the two had become intimate. She then introduces her new lover, Rear Admiral Roy Billups (Jack Black), but Pat, having briefly revived, shoots and murders Roy. Pamela then kills Pat outright. Once the group is out at sea, Tandy decapitates Pat and sends his head and body out on two separate jet skis in opposite directions, but they crash into each other. Pamela gradually irritates the group by wasting their supplies, claiming the yacht's only bedroom for herself, and flirting with Tandy. Melissa pilots the boat while drinking, and Gail botches dropping the anchor, so the boat drifts overnight and leaves them stranded in mid-ocean. After days without Gail telling anyone, they finally find a remote island. While sailing towards the island on a dinghy, Pamela, who had heard the women agree to abandon her on dry land, tricks Tandy into untying the dinghy from the boat. She knocks him unconscious, sends the rest of the group away with useless supplies, and steals the yacht, intending to keep Tandy for herself. The others reach the island, unaware that someone already lives there.
51	2	"Stocko Syndome"	David Noel	Megan Ganz & Tim McAuliffe	October 8, 2017	4AYB02	2.23
To escape being held hostage, Tandy tries convincing Pamela that he has lost interest in Carol, but she sees through his ruse and makes it clear, with her gun, that he is hers. Eventually, Tandy frees himself using a toenail clipping and threatens to harm her dog Jeremy if she does not agree to peace. She gives in, but they soon realize they are no longer near land. On the island, the main group meets Glenn (Chris Elliott), a castaway who missed the apocalypse and knows nothing about the virus, so he hopes to return to the U.S. and reunite with friends and family. He shows Carol a signal fire he has saved to alert a plane or boat, but Carol tells him it would be best to use it to find Tandy. That evening, they agree to light the signal fire, allowing Tandy and Pamela to find and reunite with them the next morning. The group wants to abandon Pamela on the island to fend for herself, but since Pamela takes responsibility for her actions and tells them to desert her, they agree to take her back to the mainland on the condition she rides in the dinghy attached to the yacht.
52	3	"Skeleton Crew"	John Solomon	Kassia Miller	October 15, 2017	4AYB03	1.96
Pamela is welcomed aboard the yacht after falling out of the dinghy, then begins a gradually intimate relationship with Glenn. Before Glenn can announce this, Jasper spots Zihuatanejo, Mexico. However, the group discovers that the whole town is the site of another triage operation from the apocalypse littered with body bags. Tandy and Carol move into a hospital near a motel, but they notice Pamela crying in the nearby courtyard and learn that Glenn has been treating her poorly following their apparent breakup. Meanwhile, Todd laments that Zihuatanejo isn't the paradise he had hoped it would be, but Melissa assures him that any new home is perfect as long as they are together. At dinner that night, Carol forgives Pamela for what she did to the group, and Pamela demands answers from Glenn. Glenn evades the truth until he finally admits he loves Pamela but wants to return to the United States in search of his children, and he treated her badly so she would not be devastated if he were to try to find his children and contract the virus. He and Pamela pack up a car and leave the next day to begin the search.
53	4	"Wisconsin"	Jennifer Arnold	Matt Marshall	October 22, 2017	4AYB04	1.96
Todd and Melissa announce their plans to go on a honeymoon, while Erica and Gail decide to live on their own for a time. Carol worries about missing precious life moments with the scattered group, so she takes Tandy to visit Gail but is upset because the rest of them were enjoying dinner together and lamely try to reassure her they weren't snubbing her or Tandy. To show them why she feels they should stay together, Carol feigns going into labor, so the others follow her to the recently restored medical clinic. When Gail arrives, she thinks she sees Carol holding her baby, but it turns out to be Tandy. Melissa, Erica, and Gail fake injuries and life-threatening situations to get back at Tandy and Carol and think Todd is joining them, but they soon realize Todd is suffering a genuine heart attack from repeated consumption of energy drinks. They rush him to the clinic and set him up to a heart monitor to successfully revive him. Gail apologizes to Carol as she reflects on how the group is a disaster together but much worse apart, then agrees to live with everyone in a location more suitable than the clinic.
54	5	"La Abuela"	David Noel	Kira Kalush	November 5, 2017	4AYB05	1.94
The group settles into a mansion once occupied by the drug cartel leader "La Abuela" Gordillo (Alma Martinez). In flashbacks, La Abuela searches for a traitor who let in a rival gang and kills her henchman Victor for not solving a Rubik's Cube quickly. Fearing he may be next, henchman Hector (Jack Guzman) prepares a bomb, then brings a piñata presumed to contain the bomb to her birthday party. The police soon arrive and force the criminals to hide. Henchman Panchito, the real traitor, shoots La Abuela and demands to know where Hector hid the bomb, but Hector does not say the exact answer and is arrested. In the present, Tandy babyproofs the mansion at Carol's insistence, helps Jasper break the piñata (which only contains candy), and struggles with Victor's Rubik's Cube. Meanwhile, Melissa extensively safety-proofs Todd after his heart attack, annoying Todd until they finally agree she should take a break from her protectiveness. Erica and Gail wonder why baby Dawn is constantly crying until Gail almost crashes their car. They discover that Dawn is an adrenaline junkie, so they hang a stuffed angry bear in her room to calm her.
55	6	"Double Cheeseburger"	Lucia Aniello	Emma Rathbone	November 12, 2017	4AYB06	2.18
Carol and Tandy awaken to find that Carol has given birth to a baby girl in her sleep, whom they name Bezequille. Carol later experiences cramps and dizziness, so she goes to Gail, and they find that Carol has an unborn second baby. They try various methods to make Carol go into labor. When these fail, Gail decides to pierce the amniotic sac, but Tandy refuses to let Gail do so. During their argument, Carol painlessly gives birth to another daughter, whom she names Mike after Tandy's brother. Meanwhile, Erica and Gail plan a date night and choose Todd to babysit Dawn. When they cancel because of the arrival of Carol's twins, Todd becomes depressed by baby fever, which Melissa notices. He convinces Erica to let him babysit Dawn but is soon caught by Melissa, who subsequently allows him to babysit Dawn after Erica and Gail reschedule their date.
56	7	"Gender Friender"	Kristen Schaal	Rich Blomquist	November 19, 2017	4AYB07	1.62
After unintentionally insulting the women of the group by calling them "guys", Tandy tries proving he is a feminist by changing words and phrases and performing an awkward song. Carol also annoys Gail about spending more time with Erica and Dawn than her twins, but Gail explains that she and Erica are like a married couple and do not need a marriage contract. When Gail wakes up in the night to take care of Dawn, she notices Erica and proposes to her the next day, so they quickly marry. At the reception, Carol believes Gail is ditching her for Erica, who confides to Carol that nothing can come between her Carol and Gail. Carol endorses their marriage, and the ladies have a mother-daughter dance. Elsewhere, Todd tries to cure his baby fever by unsuccessfully bonding with Jasper over a game of catch. Todd admits he had to teach himself various life skills, including shaving his back, which he teaches Jasper. At Erica and Gail's wedding, Jasper chooses to wear a costume at first but finally decides to wear the suit and tie Todd had picked out for him.
57	8	"Not Appropriate for Miners"	Jared Hess	Arielle Diaz & Megan Ganz	December 3, 2017	4AYB08	1.90
Jasper begins acting recklessly as he drives a limousine wildly and detonates a stuffed giraffe with a firework. Todd tries grounding him, but his efforts fail, so he goes to Tandy for help. Meanwhile, Carol is upset by Erica and Gail joking about how Jasper has affection for baby Dawn, so she tries to familiarize him with Bezequille and Mike. Erica becomes annoyed by this as she catches Carol trying entertain Jasper by putting makeup on her twins, and the ladies feud for the boy's attention. Uncertain about the source of his recklessness, Todd takes away Jasper's video games, but Jasper interrupts Melissa's attempt to solve the Rubik's Cube. Melissa finally tells the other adults that they are behaving like lunatics as they argue about Jasper, but when they all go to apologize to him, they find he has run away. As they all search the area for Jasper and apologize to one another, Tandy and Todd hear a police siren and follow the sound to a prison wherein a mysterious inmate resides.
58	9	"Karl"	Jason Woliner	Kassia Miller	January 7, 2018	4AYB09	2.96
In the days before the outbreak of the virus, Karl Cowperthwaite (Fred Armisen) is a secret cannibal who goes on a date with Zoe (Leighton Meester), but she fakes a phone call to escape their terrible dinner. When Karl walks his dog Zeus to find some bouillon for his cannibalistic dish, the police arrive at his apartment, but Karl escapes and, after killing an SUV driver (Martin Short), takes the SUV to Ciudad Juárez, Mexico. There, he starts a home painting business to hide his murders. As he prepares to kill again, the man he is painting notices a severed head in the refrigerator, forcing Karl to escape to a motel, where the police find him and arrest him for murder and desecration. In prison, Karl's next victim, Javi, falls ill from the virus. As time passes, all of the inmates and guards die from the virus, leaving only Karl and a guard named Martinez to bond. Eventually, Martinez tells Karl that it is last day, so he gives him two months' worth of food and a noose. Karl kills him and escapes his cell but cannot escape the prison. Before Karl attempts suicide with the noose, Tandy and Todd find him in the middle of their search for Jasper.
59	10	"Paint Misbehavin'"	Payman Benz	Matt Marshall	January 14, 2018	4AYB10	3.35
Karl changes into Martinez's uniform, so Tandy and Todd mistake him for a prison guard and welcome him into the group, which is still searching for Jasper. Later that day, after Gail burns her finger, Karl struggles not to take one of her band-aids from the trash, but he gives into temptation and removes it. Tandy, seeing Karl dig through the trash, becomes suspicious. Though Tandy's suspicions are dismissed due to his historically poor judge of character, he spies on Karl eating the band-aid with a cup of tea and reports this to Todd, who offers to help Tandy deal with Karl. Karl, helping Gail with her finger, secretly consumes an ice cube used to treat the burn. Karl offers to paint Gail's portrait as a gift for Erica's birthday. While painting his usual low-quality portrait, Karl is so tempted to kill Gail that he runs away and drives to a graveyard. Tandy and Todd follow and watch in shock as Karl digs up a long-dead corpse and eats its remains. Elsewhere, Melissa leaves a food cooler for Jasper, who takes it to an unknown location.
60	11	"Hamilton/Berg"	David Noel	Kira Kalush	March 18, 2018	4AYB11	1.60
Tandy and Todd attempt to tell the ladies about Karl's cannibalistic actions, but they refuse to believe what they are hearing until Karl arrives and admits he is a cannibal. The survivors agree to lock Karl back in the prison where he was found before continuing their search for Jasper. Melissa, who knows where Jasper has been all along, asks if he is ready to rejoin the group, but he silently declines. In his search for Jasper, Todd drives past the prison and notices the gate is unlocked. During the panic at the mansion surrounding Karl's escape, Melissa declares that she knows where Jasper is and encourages everyone to follow, but they overhear Karl playing the piano in a neighboring room. Karl, believing he cannot control his cannibalism, asks the group to execute him. As they draw straws to decide who will kill Karl, Carol draws the shortest straw, but Tandy cuts his straw shorter on her behalf. Tandy prepares to shoot Karl and takes 10 steps away, pretending that he is in a Burr–Hamilton duel-inspired showdown, when Karl suddenly solves the Rubik's Cube, which explodes and kills him.
61	12	"Señor Clean"	Maggie Carey	Maxwell R. Kessler	March 25, 2018	4AYB12	1.61
The group holds a funeral for Karl inside the prison, although Tandy does not know how Karl actually died. During the funeral, Gail admits how happy she has been since the virus and how Tandy has changed over time. Tandy decides to be helpful and change the way he says things, which gets him on Gail's good side. They eventually share a drink, and she puts her hand on his hand, telling him that they are much more than friends. Under the impression that Gail wants to do something sexually, Tandy confronts her about it. Carol and Gail both believe that Tandy misunderstood the situation, but Tandy notes that Gail will "get over it". Meanwhile, Todd is angry at Melissa for not telling him about Jasper's whereabouts and demands that she bring him to Jasper. When she says no, he stows away in her car during her next trip. After Melissa comforts Jasper, she finds Todd waiting by the car, and he expresses his fears that his chances of being a father are over. Melissa finally says that Todd can have a baby, but she does not want to be the mother, so they agree to speak to Erica.
62	13	"Release the Hounds"	Steve Day	Megan Ganz	April 1, 2018	4AYB13	1.37
Erica tells Todd that she does not want to have a baby with him. Feeling depressed, he withdraws from the group and becomes obsessed with building and playing with an elaborate model train set. Gail, acting as the group's physician, reluctantly gives Tandy and Carol permission to have sex only two weeks after Carol gave birth to twins. About seven months later, Carol is in her second pregnancy, Gail is six months into giving up red wine for white, and Todd is still playing with his trains in self-imposed isolation. When Tandy and Carol show Todd that she is again pregnant, he angrily destroys his elaborate train set, shaves his long beard, cuts his hair, and emerges as his former self. While reminiscing with Dawn, Erica decides she wants a sibling for her daughter. As Todd starts to read a prepared speech to announce the end of his train obsession, Erica declares that she wants to have a child with Todd. Elsewhere, an unseen stranger finds one of Tandy's baby diaper disposal balloons.
63	14	"Special Delivery"	Jason Woliner	Emma Rathbone	April 8, 2018	4AYB14	1.51
After Todd and Erica agree to have a child together, Todd acts anxiously as he anticipates the progress of Erica's planned pregnancy, which gets on her nerves. When Erica's pregnancy test turns out negative, Todd accuses her of sabotaging the pregnancy. Melissa further annoys Erica by reading poetry about her and asking to do a variety of tasks for her in an effort to form a strong female friendship. In the end, Todd and Melissa each understand how they were mistreating Erica, so Todd gives her the personal space she needs, and Melissa confesses that she did not have any close female friends in the past. Meanwhile, Carol suspects that a stranger is living nearby upon discovering a bag of fresh poop. The group infers that it was most likely Jasper's, but Carol installs a series of wind chimes in case it wasn't. Outside Zihuatanejo, an unseen man encounters Jasper. When Carol hears a strange sound that night, Tandy investigates and finds nothing, but he wakes up the next morning to discover half of his head and face shaved.
64	15	"Designated Survivors"	Payman Benz	Edward Voccola	April 15, 2018	4AYB15	1.36
After waking up to find half of his head shaven, Tandy concludes his brother Mike is still alive. He finds Mike by following a trail of his shaved hair and paper notes, and the brothers celebrate by singing a karaoke rendition of their favorite song, "Falling Slowly". Mike pulls more pranks on the group until they catch him, so he explains that he did not have the virus, but his immune system was briefly weakened from being in space. Tandy and Carol then introduce Mike to their twins, and Mike shows Tandy his truck's thermal imaging device, which he used to find the group. Meanwhile, Todd is thrown into a spiral, believing Mike may replace him as Erica's primary sperm donor. He demands that Tandy choose between him and Mike, whose truck he vandalizes before Mike reminds Todd to appreciate what he already has in his life. Todd apologizes to Erica, who cheers him up by confirming she is pregnant. At the end of the day, Mike discovers a mysterious blob on his thermal imaging device.
65	16	"The Blob"	Jason Woliner	Erik Durbin & Sarah K. Moss	April 22, 2018	4AYB16	1.54
Tandy attempts to perform karaoke with Carol but finds it is not the same without Mike, who hasn't left his truck since he found a large blob on his thermal imaging machine. Tandy attempts to stop him from leaving to investigate. After Tandy expresses his fears of Mike leaving since the world is not safe, Mike agrees to stay, and the brothers have a day of zorb bowling and playing with Tandy's daughters. When Tandy catches his brother stealing back the truck keys, Mike admits that he is jealous of how Tandy has a family and hopes to start his own family if the blob means more people are living nearby. Carol gives Tandy permission to go investigate the blob with Mike, but not before Mike cuts the remaining half of his hair and beard and leaves a rattail in back. Meanwhile, Todd and Erica have trouble seeing eye-to-eye on a color for their future child's room, but they eventually compromise to paint the walls yellow with a blue trim. During their painting, however, Todd accidentally uncovers a corpse in one wall.
66	17	"Barbara Ann"	David Noel	Tim McAuliffe & David Noel	April 29, 2018	4AYB17	1.77
Tandy and Mike travel to locate the mysterious blob on Mike's thermal imaging device. In Tapachula, they encounter a grove of avocado and orange trees, plus a herd of goats, and take a male and female goat with them to the location of the blob. When they arrive, the location turns out to be deserted. Tandy reminds Mike of his first encountering Carol before attempting suicide and how they shouldn't give up hope. He then cheers Mike up by teasing him about dating the goats and singing another song. Meanwhile, following his discovery of a corpse in the mansion walls, Todd finds more human remains as well as piles of guns, grenades, bricks of cocaine, and millions of dollars in various currencies. Todd alerts the group, and Melissa discovers that the grenades are in working condition. They decide to search the rest of the mansion and discover more hidden dangers, including a loaded bomb in a piano that explodes. Tandy and Mike return to the mansion and learn that the group is moving. Back at the site of the blob, 94 humans exit an underground hatch and move towards Zihuatanejo.
67	18	"Cancun, Baby!"	Nisha Ganatra	Rich Blomquist & John Solomon	May 6, 2018	4AYB18	1.66
After Tandy detonates the mansion and accidentally kills the two goats he and Mike found, the group departs aboard a cable car driven by a flatbed truck towards Cancún, stopping at the fruit trees in Tapachula. Melissa leaves Jasper a self-driving car to join them if he wants. The group then finds the goat herd and prepares to leave. Tandy finds a quaint house beside the small grove and attempts to play catch with his robot dog Clancy, but he discovers the robot's batteries are corroded. While digging a grave for Clancy, he encounters a live dog, who returns the next day. Tandy decides the small house has sufficient supply of produce and goats. The group agrees. Tandy gives Mike the keys to the truck, allowing him to find his own happiness. Tandy snips off his rattail and tapes it to the back of Mike's head as a memento, and Mike reciprocates with his armpit hair. As the survivors set up camp, they are soon surrounded by the underground colonists.

== Ratings ==
The Last Man on Earth : U.S. viewers per episode (millions)

Season	Episode number																		Average
Season	1	2	3	4	5	6	7	8	9	10	11	12	13	14	15	16	17	18	Average
1	5.75	5.75	4.35	3.76	4.55	4.42	3.40	3.33	3.22	3.37	3.41	3.29	3.51	–					3.99
2	3.14	3.30	2.70	2.29	3.36	2.57	2.84	3.27	3.58	3.16	2.72	2.56	2.11	2.70	2.52	2.13	2.21	2.23	2.74
3	2.23	2.50	2.66	2.14	2.13	2.64	2.04	2.48	2.21	2.19	2.04	1.97	1.97	1.74	1.73	1.96	1.76	1.84	2.12
4	2.28	2.23	1.96	1.96	1.94	2.18	1.62	1.90	2.96	3.35	1.60	1.61	1.37	1.51	1.36	1.54	1.77	1.66	1.95

Audience measurement performed by Nielsen Media Research
