= Intimate relationship =

Physical or emotional intimacy

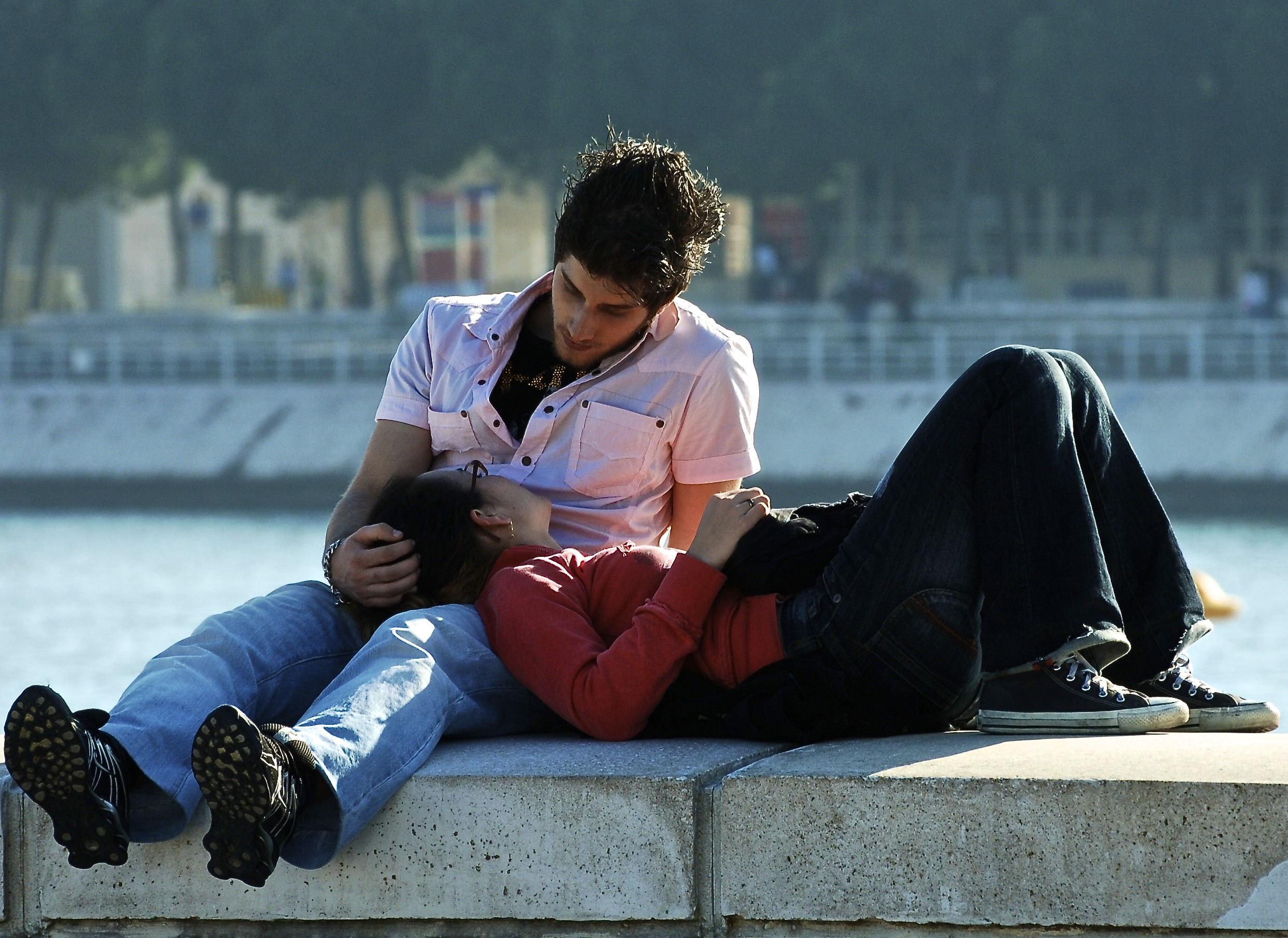
Intimate relationships involve emotional or physical closeness.

An intimate relationship is an interpersonal relationship that involves emotional or physical closeness between people and can include feelings of romantic or platonic love and sexual intimacy. Intimate relationships are interdependent, and the members of the relationship mutually influence each other. The quality and nature of the relationship depend on the interactions between individuals, and is derived from the unique context and history that builds between people over time. Social and legal institutions such as marriage acknowledge and uphold intimate relationships between people. However, intimate relationships are not necessarily monogamous or sexual, and there is wide social and cultural variability in the norms and practices of intimacy between people.

The course of an intimate relationship includes a formation period prompted by interpersonal attraction and a growing sense of closeness and familiarity. Intimate relationships evolve over time as they are maintained, and members of the relationship may become more invested in and committed to the relationship. Healthy intimate relationships are beneficial for psychological and physical well-being and contribute to overall happiness in life. However, challenges including relationship conflict, external stressors, insecurity, and jealousy can disrupt the relationship and lead to distress and relationship dissolution.

== Intimacy ==
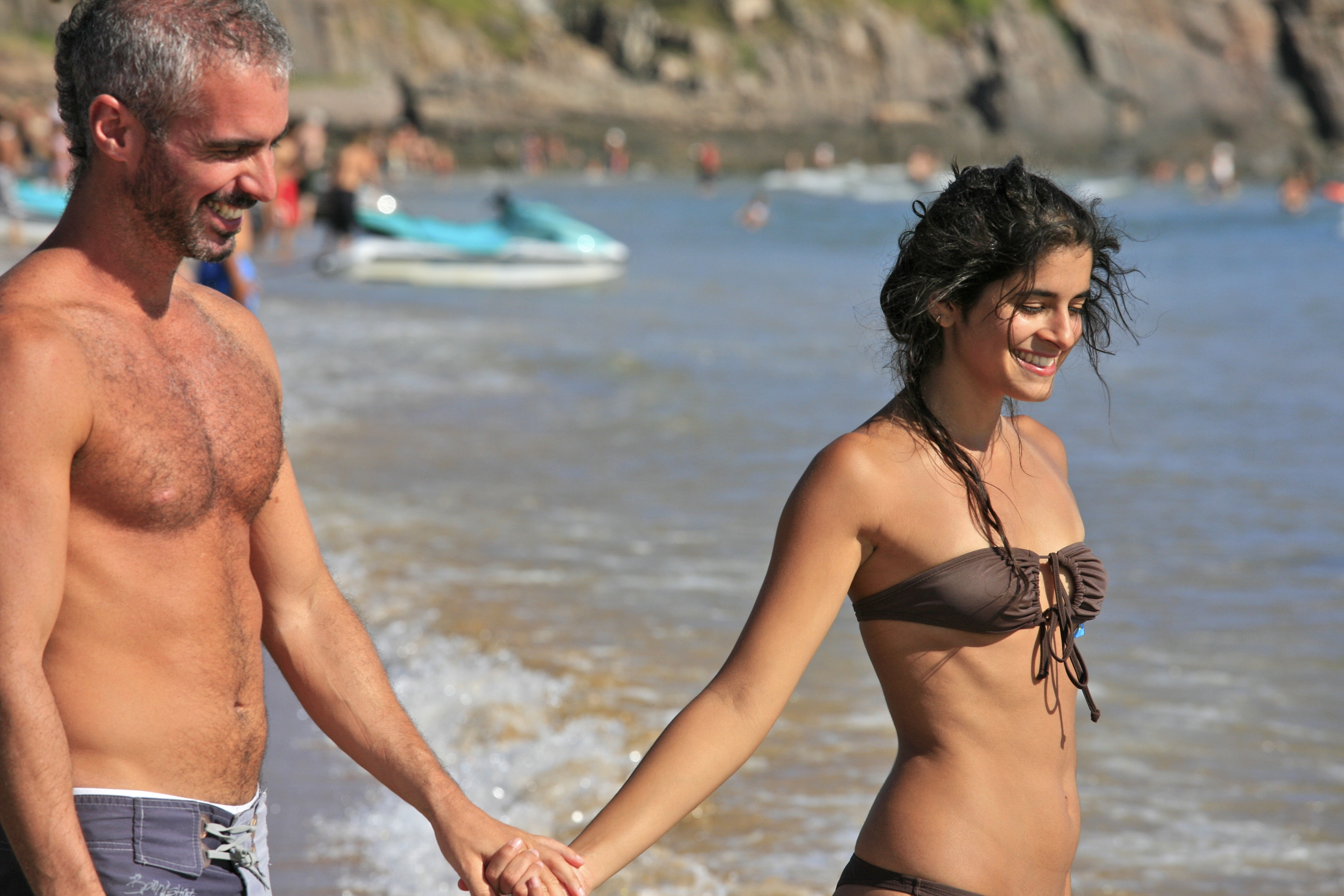
A couple holding hands at Punta del Este, Uruguay

Intimacy is the feeling of being in close, personal association with another person. Emotional intimacy is built through self-disclosure and responsive communication between people, and is critical for healthy psychological development and mental health. Emotional intimacy produces feelings of reciprocal trust, validation, vulnerability, and closeness between individuals.

Physical intimacy—including holding hands, hugging, kissing, and sex—promotes connection between people and is often a key component of romantic intimate relationships. Physical touch is correlated with relationship satisfaction and feelings of love. While many intimate relationships include a physical or sexual component, the potential to be sexual is not a requirement for the relationship to be intimate. For example, a queerplatonic relationship is a non-romantic intimate relationship that involves commitment and closeness beyond that of a friendship.

Among scholars, the definition of an intimate relationship is diverse and evolving. Some reserve the term for romantic relationships, whereas other scholars include friendship and familial relationships. In general, an intimate relationship is an interpersonal relationship in which physically or emotionally intimate experiences occur repeatedly over time.

== Course of intimate relationships ==
Factors influencing Interpersonal attraction

=== Formation ===
==== Attraction ====
Interpersonal attraction is the foundation of first impressions between potential intimate partners. Relationship scientists suggest that the romantic spark, or "chemistry", that occurs between people is a combination of physical attraction, personal qualities, and a build-up of positive interactions between people. Researchers find physical attractiveness to be the largest predictor of initial attraction. From an evolutionary perspective, this may be because people search for a partner (or potential mate) who displays indicators of good physical health. Yet, there is also evidence that couples in committed intimate relationships tend to match each other in physical attractiveness, and are rated as similarly physically attractive by both the members of the couple and by outside observers. An individual's perception of their own attractiveness may therefore influence who they see as a realistic partner.

Beyond physical appearance, people report desirable qualities they look for in a partner such as trustworthiness, warmth, and loyalty. However, these romantic ideals are not necessarily good predictors of actual attraction or relationship success. Research has found little evidence for the success of matching potential partners based on personality traits, suggesting that romantic chemistry involves more than compatibility of traits. Rather, repeated positive interactions between people and reciprocity of romantic interest seem to be key components in attraction and relationship formation. Reciprocal liking is most meaningful when it is displayed by someone who is selective about who they show liking to.

==== Initiation strategies ====
When potential intimate partners are getting to know each other, they employ a variety of strategies to increase closeness and gain information about whether the other person is a desirable partner. Self-disclosure, the process of revealing information about oneself, is a crucial aspect of building intimacy between people. Feelings of intimacy increase when a conversation partner is perceived as responsive and reciprocates self-disclosure, and people tend to like others who disclose emotional information to them. Other strategies used in the relationship formation stage include humor, initiating physical touch, and signaling availability and interest through eye contact, flirtatious body language, or playful interactions. Engaging in dating, courtship, or hookup culture as part of the relationship formation period allows individuals to explore different interpersonal connections before further investing in an intimate relationship.

==== Context ====
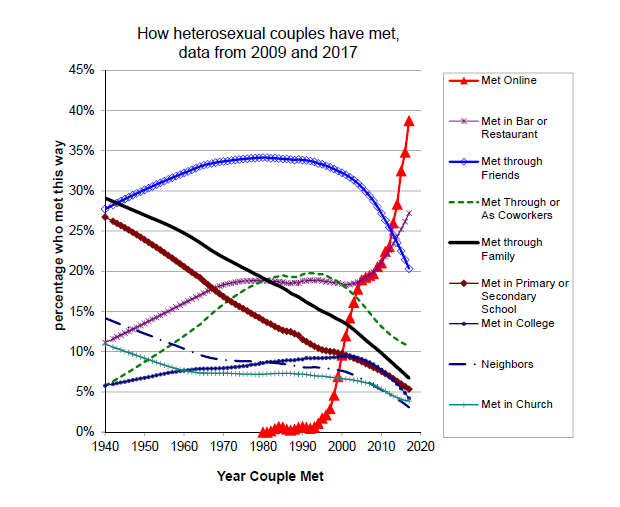
The internet has become a popular avenue for meeting an intimate partner.

Context, timing, and external circumstances influence attraction and whether an individual is receptive to beginning an intimate relationship. Readiness for a relationship varies across the lifespan, and external pressures such as family expectations, peers being in committed relationships, and cultural norms can affect when people decide to pursue an intimate relationship.

Being in close physical proximity is a powerful facilitator for formation of relationships because it allows people to get to know each other through repeated interactions. Intimate partners commonly meet at college or school, as coworkers, as neighbors, at bars, or through religious community. Speed dating, matchmakers, and online dating services are more structured formats used to begin relationships. The internet in particular has significantly changed how intimate relationships begin as it allows people to access potential partners beyond their immediate proximity. In 2023, Pew Research Center found that 53% of people under 30 have used online dating, and one in ten adults in a committed relationship met their partner online. However, there remains skepticism about the effectiveness and safety of dating apps due to their potential to facilitate dating violence.

=== Maintenance ===
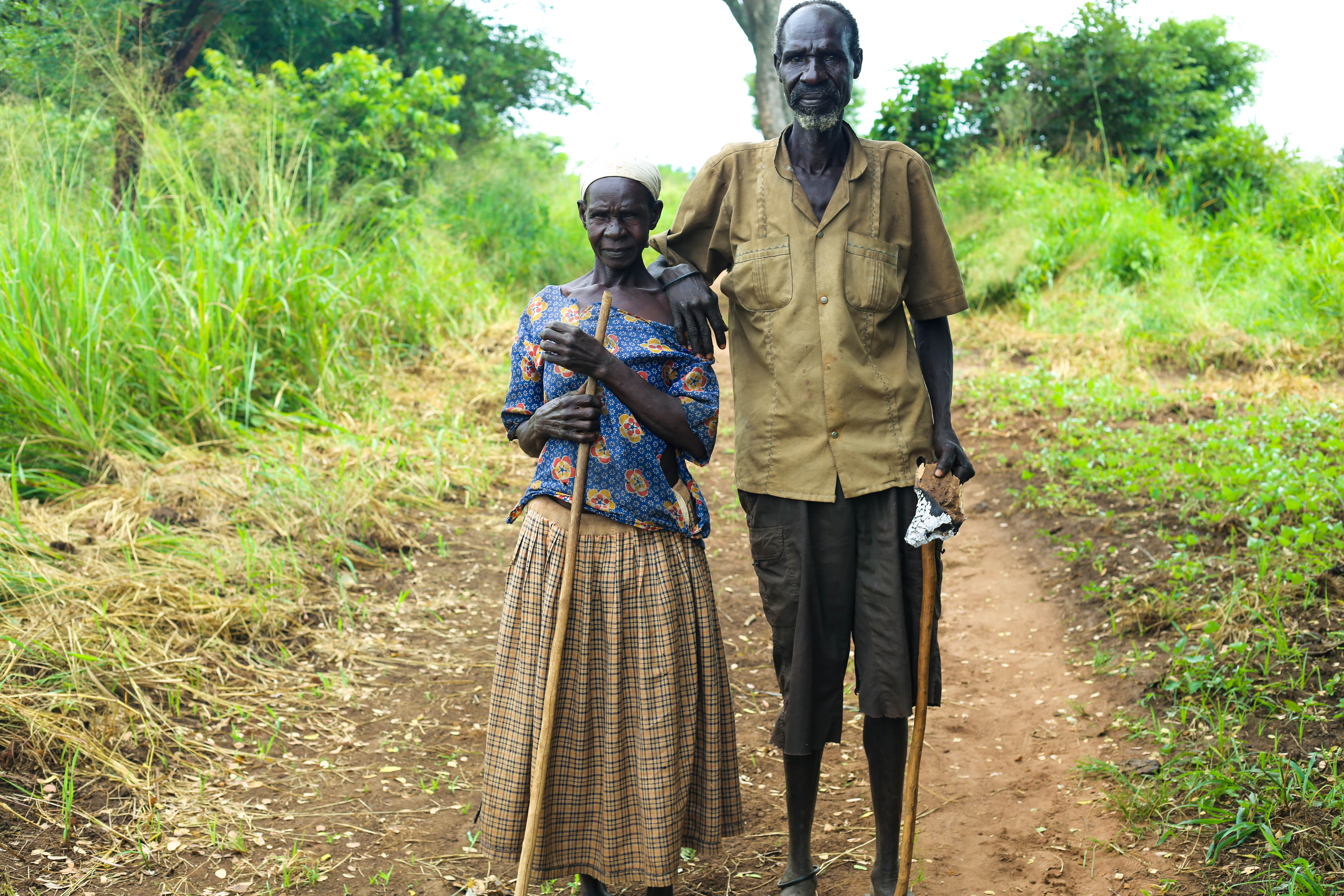
A couple in Uganda.

Once an intimate relationship has been initiated, the relationship changes and develops over time, and the members may engage in commitment agreements and maintenance behaviors. In an ongoing relationship, couples must navigate protecting their own self-interest alongside the interest of maintaining the relationship. This necessitates compromise, sacrifice, and communication. In general, feelings of intimacy and commitment increase as a relationship progresses, while passion plateaus following the excitement of the early stages of the relationship.

Engaging in ongoing positive shared communication and activities is important for strengthening the relationship and increasing commitment and liking between partners. These maintenance behaviors can include providing assurances about commitment to the relationship, engaging in shared activities, openly disclosing thoughts and feelings, spending time with mutual friends, and contributing to shared responsibilities. Physical intimacy including sexual behavior also increases feelings of closeness and satisfaction with the relationship. However, sexual desire is often greatest early in a relationship, and may wax and wane as the relationship evolves. Significant life events such as the birth of a child can drastically change the relationship and necessitate adaptation and new approaches to maintaining intimacy. The transition to parenthood can be a stressful period that is generally associated with a temporary decrease in healthy relationship functioning and a decline in sexual intimacy.

==== Commitment ====
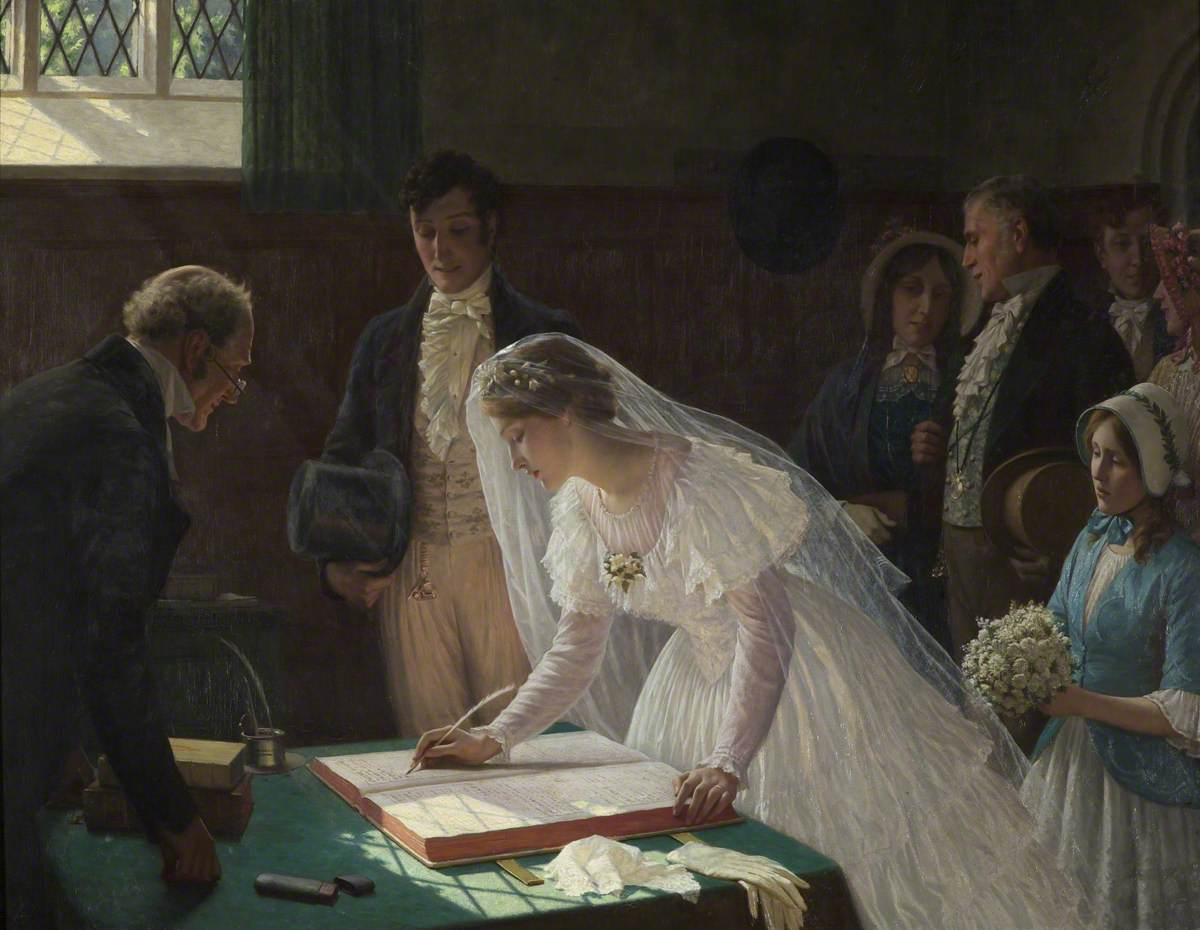
Marriage is a form of relationship maintenance that signals commitment between partners.

As a relationship develops, intimate partners often engage in commitment agreements, ceremonies, and behaviors to signal their intention to remain in the relationship. This might include moving in together, sharing responsibilities or property, and getting married. These commitment markers increase relationship stability because they create physical, financial, and symbolic barriers and consequences to dissolving the relationship. In general, increases in relationship satisfaction and investment are associated with increased commitment. Commitment before initiating sexual activity tends to lead to increased relationship satisfaction and stability according to a 2014 study.

==== Evaluating the relationship ====
Individuals in intimate relationships evaluate the relative personal benefits and costs of being in the relationship, and this contributes to the decision to stay or leave. The investment model of commitment is a theoretical framework that suggests that an evaluation of relationship satisfaction, relationship investment, and the quality of alternatives to the relationship impact whether an individual remains in a relationship.

Because relationships are rewarding and evolutionarily necessary, and rejection is a stressful process, people are generally biased toward making decisions that uphold and further facilitate intimate relationships. These biases can lead to distortions in the evaluation of a relationship. For instance, people in committed relationships tend to dismiss and derogate attractive alternative partners, thereby validating the decision to remain with their more attractive partner.

=== Dissolution ===
The decision to leave a relationship often involves an evaluation of levels of satisfaction and commitment in the relationship. Relationship factors such as increased commitment and feelings of love are associated with lower chances of breakup, whereas feeling ambivalent about the relationship and perceiving many alternatives to the current relationship are associated with increased chances of dissolution.

==== Predictors of dissolution ====
Specific individual characteristics and traits put people at greater risk for experiencing relationship dissolution. Individuals high in neuroticism (the tendency to experience negative emotions) are more prone to relationship dissolution, and research also shows small effects of attachment avoidance and anxiety in predicting breakup. Being married at a younger age, having lower income, lower educational attainment, and cohabiting before marriage are also associated with risk of divorce and relationship dissolution. These characteristics are not necessarily the inherent causes of dissolution. Rather, they are traits that impact the resources that individuals are able to draw upon to work on their relationships as well as reflections of social and cultural attitudes toward relationship institutions and divorce.

==== Strategies and consequences ====
Common strategies for ending a relationship include justifying the decision, apologizing, avoiding contact (ghosting), or suggesting a "break" period before revisiting the decision. The dissolution of an intimate relationship is a stressful event that can have a negative impact on well-being, and the rejection can elicit strong feelings of embarrassment, sadness, and anger. Following a relationship breakup, individuals are at risk for anxiety, depressive symptoms, problematic substance use, and low self-esteem. However, the period following a break-up can also promote personal growth, particularly if the previous relationship was not fulfilling.

== Benefits ==
=== Psychological well-being ===
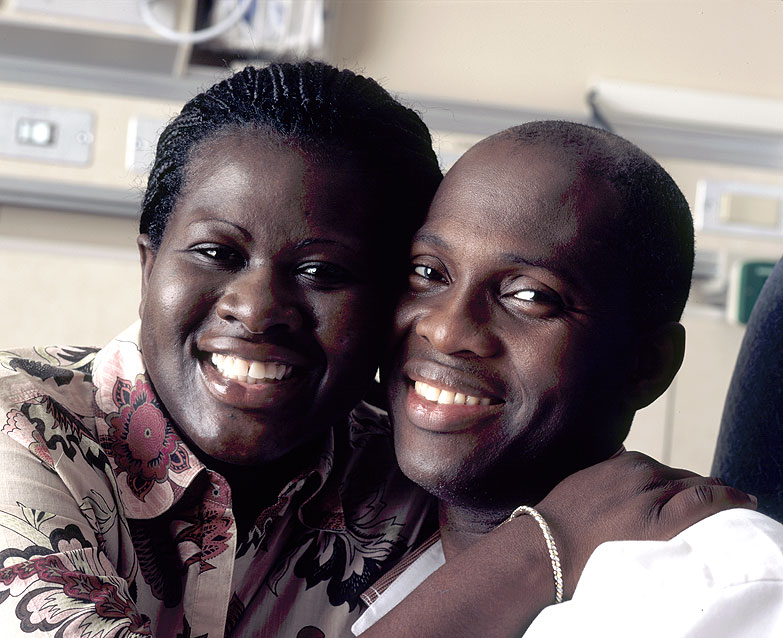
Intimate relationships impact well-being.

Intimate relationships impact happiness and satisfaction with life. While people with better mental health are more likely to enter intimate relationships, the relationships themselves also have a positive impact on mental health even after controlling for the selection effect. In general, marriage and other types of committed intimate relationships are consistently linked to increases in happiness. Furthermore, due to the interdependent nature of relationships, one partner's life satisfaction influences and predicts change in the other person's life satisfaction even after controlling for relationship quality.

==== Social support ====
Social support from an intimate partner is beneficial for coping with stress and significant life events. Having a close relationship with someone who is perceived as responsive and validating helps to alleviate the negative impact of stress, and shared activities with an intimate partner aids in regulating emotions associated with stressful experiences. Support for positive experiences can also improve relationship quality and increase shared positive emotions between people. When a person responds actively and constructively to their partner sharing good news (a process called "capitalization"), well-being for both individuals increases.

==== Sexual intimacy ====
In intimate relationships that are sexual, sexual satisfaction is closely tied to overall relationship satisfaction. Sex promotes intimacy, increases happiness, provides pleasure, and reduces stress. Studies show that couples who have sex at least once per week report greater well-being than those who have sex less than once per week. Research in human sexuality finds that the ingredients of high quality sex include feeling connected to your partner, good communication, vulnerability, and feeling present in the moment. High quality sex in intimate relationships can both strengthen the relationship and improve well-being for each individual involved.

=== Physical health ===
High quality intimate relationships have a positive impact on physical health, and associations between close relationships and health outcomes involving the cardiovascular, immune, and endocrine systems have been consistently identified in the scientific literature. Better relationship quality is associated lower risk of mortality and relationship quality impacts inflammatory responses such as cytokine expression and intracellular signaling. Furthermore, intimate partners are an important source of social support for encouraging healthy behaviors such as increasing physical activity and quitting smoking. Sexual activity and other forms of physical intimacy also contribute positively to physical health, while conflict between intimate partners negatively impacts the immune and endocrine systems and can increase blood pressure.

Laboratory experiments show evidence for the association between support from intimate partners and physical health. In a study assessing recovery from wounds and inflammation, individuals in relationships high in conflict and hostility recovered from wounds more slowly than people in low-hostility relationships. The presence or imagined presence of an intimate partner can even impact perceived pain. In fMRI studies, participants who view an image of their intimate partner report less pain in response to a stimulus compared to participants who view the photo of a stranger. In another laboratory study, women who received a text message from their partner showed reduced cardiovascular response to the Trier Social Stress Test, a stress-inducing paradigm.

== Challenges ==
=== Conflict ===
Disagreements within intimate relationships are a stressful event, and the strategies couples use to navigate conflict impact the quality and success of the relationship. Common sources of conflict between intimate partners include disagreements about the balance of work and family life, frequency of sex, finances, and household tasks. Psychologist John Gottman's research has identified three stages of conflict in couples. First, couples present their opinions and feelings on the issue. Next, they argue and attempt to persuade the other of their viewpoint, and finally, the members of the relationship negotiate to try to arrive at a compromise.

Individuals vary in how they typically engage with conflict. Gottman describes that happy couples differ from unhappy couples in their interactions during conflict: unhappy couples tend to use more frequent negative tone of voice, show more predictable behavior during communication, and get stuck in cycles of negative behavior with their partner. Other unproductive strategies within conflict include avoidance and withdrawal, defensiveness, and hostility. These responses may be salient when an individual feels threatened by the conflict, which can be a reflection of insecure attachment orientation and previous negative relationship experiences. When conflicts go unresolved, relationship satisfaction is negatively impacted. Constructive conflict resolution strategies include validating the other person's point of view and concerns, expressing affection, using humor, and active listening. However, the effectiveness of these strategies depends on the topic and severity of the conflict and the characteristics of the individuals involved. Repeated stressful instances of unresolved conflict might cause intimate partners to seek couples counseling, consult self-help resources, or consider ending the relationship.

=== Attachment insecurity ===
Attachment orientations that develop from early interpersonal relationships can influence how people behave in intimate relationships, and insecure attachment can lead to specific issues in a relationship. Individuals vary in attachment anxiety (the degree to which they worry about abandonment) and avoidance (the degree to which they avoid emotional closeness). Research shows that insecure attachment orientations that are high in avoidance or anxiety are associated with experiencing more frequent negative emotions in intimate relationships.

Individuals high in attachment anxiety are particularly prone to jealousy and experience heightened distress about whether their partner will leave them. Highly anxious individuals also perceive more conflict in their relationships and are disproportionately negatively affected by those conflicts. In contrast, avoidantly attached individuals may experience fear of intimacy or be dismissive of the potential benefits of a close relationship and thus have difficulty building an intimate connection with a partner.

=== Stress ===
Stress that occurs both within and outside an intimate relationship—including financial issues, familial obligations, and stress at work—can negatively impact the quality of the relationship. Stress depletes the psychological resources that are crucial for developing and maintaining a healthy relationship. Rather than spending energy investing in the relationship through shared activities, sex and physical intimacy, and healthy communication, couples under stress are forced to use their psychological resources to manage other pressing issues. Low socioeconomic status is a particularly salient stressful context that constrains an individual's ability to invest in maintaining a healthy intimate relationship. Couples with lower socioeconomic status are at risk for experiencing increased rates of dissolution and lower relationship satisfaction.

=== Infidelity ===
Infidelity and sex outside a monogamous relationship are behaviors that are commonly disapproved of, a frequent source of conflict, and a cause of relationship dissolution. Low relationship satisfaction may cause people to desire physical or emotional connection outside their primary relationship. However, people with more sexual opportunities, greater interest in sex, and more permissive attitudes toward sex are also more likely to engage in infidelity. In the United States, research has found that between 15 and 25% of adults report ever cheating on a partner.

When one member of a relationship violates agreements of sexual or emotional exclusivity, the foundation of trust in the primary relationship is negatively impacted, and individuals may experience depression, low self-esteem, and emotional dysregulation in the aftermath of an affair. Infidelity is ultimately tied to increased likelihood of relationship dissolution or divorce.

=== Intimate partner violence ===
Violence within an intimate relationship can take the form of physical, psychological, financial, or sexual abuse. The World Health Organization estimates that 30% of women have experienced physical or sexual violence perpetrated by an intimate partner. The strong emotional attachment, investment, and interdependence that characterizes close relationships can make it difficult to leave an abusive relationship.

Research has identified a variety of risk factors for and types of perpetrators of intimate partner violence. Individuals who are exposed to violence or experience abuse in childhood are more likely to become perpetrators or victims of intimate partner violence as adults as part of the intergenerational cycle of violence. Perpetrators are also more likely to be aggressive, impulsive, prone to anger, and may show pathological personality traits such as antisocial and borderline traits. Patriarchal cultural scripts that depict men as aggressive and dominant may be an additional risk factor for men engaging in violence toward an intimate partner, although violence by female perpetrators is also a well-documented phenomenon and research finds other contextual and demographic characteristics to be more salient risks factors. Contextual factors such as high levels of stress can also contribute to risk of violence. Within the relationship, high levels of conflict and disagreements are associated with intimate partner violence, particularly for people who react to conflict with hostility.

== Social and cultural variability ==
=== Culture ===
Cultural context has influence in many domains within intimate relationships including norms in communication, expression of affection, commitment and marriage practices, and gender roles. For example, cross-cultural research finds that individuals in China prefer indirect and implicit communication with their romantic partner, whereas European Americans report preferring direct communication. The use of a culturally appropriate communication style influences anticipated relationship satisfaction. Culture can also impact expectations within a relationship and the relative importance of various relationship-centered values such as emotional closeness, equity, status, and autonomy.

While love has been identified as a universal human emotion, the ways love is expressed and its importance in intimate relationships vary based on the culture within which a relationship takes place. Culture is especially salient in structuring beliefs about institutions that recognize intimate relationships such as marriage. The idea that love is necessary for marriage is a strongly held belief in the United States, whereas in India, a distinction is made between traditional arranged marriages and "love marriages" (also called personal choice marriages).

=== LGBTQ+ intimacy ===
==== Same-sex intimate relationships ====
Advances in legal relationship recognition for same-sex couples have helped normalize and legitimize same-sex intimacy. Broadly, same-sex and different-sex intimate relationships do not differ significantly, and couples report similar levels of relationship satisfaction and stability. However, research supports a few common differences between same-sex and different-sex intimacy. In the relationship formation period, the boundaries between friendship and romantic intimacy may be more nuanced and complex among sexual minorities. For instance, many lesbian women report that their romantic relationships developed from an existing friendship. Certain relationship maintenance practices also differ. While heterosexual relationships might rely on traditional gender roles to divide labor and decision-making power, same-sex couples are more likely to divide housework evenly. Lesbian couples report lower frequency of sex compared to heterosexual couples, and gay men are more likely to engage in non-monogamy.

Same-sex relationships face unique challenges with regards to stigma, discrimination, and social support. As couples cope with these obstacles, relationship quality can be negatively affected. Unsupportive policy environments such as same-sex marriage bans have a negative impact on well-being, while being out as a couple and living in a place with legal same-sex relationship recognition have a positive impact on individual and couple well-being.

==== Asexuality ====
Some asexual people engage in intimate relationships that are solely emotionally intimate, but other asexual people's relationships involve sex as part of negotiations with non-asexual partners. A 2019 study of sexual minority individuals in the United States found that while asexual individuals were less likely to have recently had sex, they did not differ from non-asexual participants in rates of being in an intimate relationship. Asexual individuals face stigma and the pathologization of their sexual orientation, and report difficulty navigating assumptions about sexuality in the dating scene. Various terms including "queerplatonic relationship" and "squish" (a non-sexual crush) have been used by the asexual community to describe non-sexual intimate relationships and desires.

=== Non-monogamy ===
Non-monogamy, including polyamory, open relationships, and swinging, is the practice of engaging in intimate relationships that are not strictly monogamous, or consensually engaging in multiple physically or emotionally intimate relationships. The degree of emotional and physical intimacy between different partners can vary. For example, swinging relationships are primarily sexual, whereas people in polyamorous relationships might engage in both emotional and physical intimacy with multiple partners. Individuals in consensually non-monogamous intimate relationships identify several benefits to their relationship configuration including having their needs met by multiple partners, engaging in a greater variety of shared activities with partners, and feelings of autonomy and personal growth.

== See also ==
- Attachment theory
- Breakup
- Couples therapy
- Dating
- Emotional intimacy
- Friendship
- Homogamy (sociology)
- Human bonding
- Hypergamy
- Interpersonal attraction
- Intimate partner violence
- Monogamy
- Outline of relationships
- Physical intimacy
- Relationship science
- Romance
- Same-sex relationship
- Sexual attraction
- Significant other
- Social buffering
