= Social connection =

Experience of feeling close and connected to others

Social connection is the experience of feeling close and connected to others. It involves feeling loved, cared for, and valued, and forms the basis of interpersonal relationships.

"Connection is the energy that exists between people when they feel seen, heard and valued; when they can give and receive without judgement; and when they derive sustenance and strength from the relationship." —Brené Brown, Professor of social work at the University of Houston

Increasingly, social connection is understood as a core human need, and the desire to connect as a fundamental drive. It is crucial to development; without it, social animals experience distress and face severe developmental consequences. In humans, one of the most social species, social connection is essential to nearly every aspect of health and well-being. Lack of connection, or loneliness, has been linked to inflammation, accelerated aging and cardiovascular health risk, suicide, and all-cause mortality.

Feeling socially connected depends on the quality and number of meaningful relationships one has with family, friends, and acquaintances. Going beyond the individual level, it also involves a feeling of connecting to a larger community. Connectedness on a community level has profound benefits for both individuals and society.

== Related terms ==
Social support is the help, advice, and comfort that we receive from those with whom we have stable, positive relationships. Importantly, it appears to be the perception, or feeling, of being supported, rather than objective number of connections, that appears to buffer stress and affect our health and psychology most strongly.

Close relationships refer to those relationships between friends or romantic partners that are characterized by love, caring, commitment, and intimacy.

Attachment is a deep emotional bond between two or more people, a "lasting psychological connectedness between human beings." Attachment theory, developed by John Bowlby during the 1950s, is a theory that remains influential in psychology today.

Conviviality has many different interpretations and understandings, one of which denotes the idea of living together and enjoying each other's company. This understanding of the term is derived from the French convivialité, which can be traced back to Jean Anthelme Brillat-Savarin in the 19th century. Other interpretations of conviviality include the art of living in the company of others; everyday experiences of community cohesion and togetherness in diverse settings; and the capacity of individuals to interact creatively and autonomously with one another and their environment for the satisfaction of their needs. This third interpretation is rooted in the work of Ivan Illich from the 1970s onwards. Social connection is fundamental to all of these interpretations of conviviality.

== A basic need ==
In his influential theory on the hierarchy of needs, Abraham Maslow proposed that our physiological needs are the most basic and necessary to our survival, and must be satisfied before we can move on to satisfying more complex social needs like love and belonging. However, research over the past few decades has begun to shift our understanding of this hierarchy. Social connection and belonging may in fact be a basic need, as powerful as our need for food or water. Mammals are born relatively helpless, and rely on their caregivers not only for affection, but for survival. This may be evolutionarily why mammals need and seek connection, and also for why they suffer prolonged distress and health consequences when that need is not met.

In 1965, Harry Harlow conducted his landmark monkey studies. He separated baby monkeys from their mothers, and observed which surrogate mothers the baby monkeys bonded with: a wire "mother" that provided food, or a cloth "mother" that was soft and warm. Overwhelmingly, the baby monkeys preferred to spend time clinging to the cloth mother, only reaching over to the wire mother when they became too hungry to continue without food. This study questioned the idea that food is the most powerful primary reinforcement for learning. Instead, Harlow's studies suggested that warmth, comfort, and affection (as perceived from the soft embrace of the cloth mother) are crucial to the mother-child bond, and may be a powerful reward that mammals may seek in and of itself. Although historically significant, it is important to acknowledge that this study does not meet current research standards for the ethical treatment of animals.

In 1995, Roy Baumeister proposed his influential belongingness hypothesis: that human beings have a fundamental drive to form lasting relationships, to belong. He provided substantial evidence that indeed, the need to belong and form close bonds with others is itself a motivating force in human behavior. This theory is supported by evidence that people form social bonds relatively easily, are reluctant to break social bonds, and keep the effect on their relationships in mind when they interpret situations. He also contends that our emotions are so deeply linked to our relationships that one of the primary functions of emotion may be to form and maintain social bonds, and that both partial and complete deprivation of relationships leads to not only painful but pathological consequences. Satisfying or disrupting our need to belong, our need for connection, has been found to influence cognition, emotion, and behavior.

In 2011, Roy Baumeister furthered this notion of belongingness by proposing the Need to Belong Theory, which asserts that humans have an inherent drive to maintain a minimum number of social relationships to foster a sense of belonging. Baumeister highlights the importance of satiation and substitution in driving human behavior and social connection. Motivational satiation is a phenomenon in which an individual may desire something, but at a certain point, they may reach a point where they have had enough and no longer want or need any more of it. This concept can be applied to the formation of friendships, where an individual may desire social connections, but they may reach a point where they have enough friends and do not seek any more. However, Baumeister suggests that people still require a certain minimum amount of social connection, and to some extent, these bonds can substitute for each other. The Need to Belong Theory is a primary motivator of human behavior, providing a framework for understanding social relationships as a basic, fundamental need for psychological health and well-being.

== Neurobiology ==
=== Brain areas ===
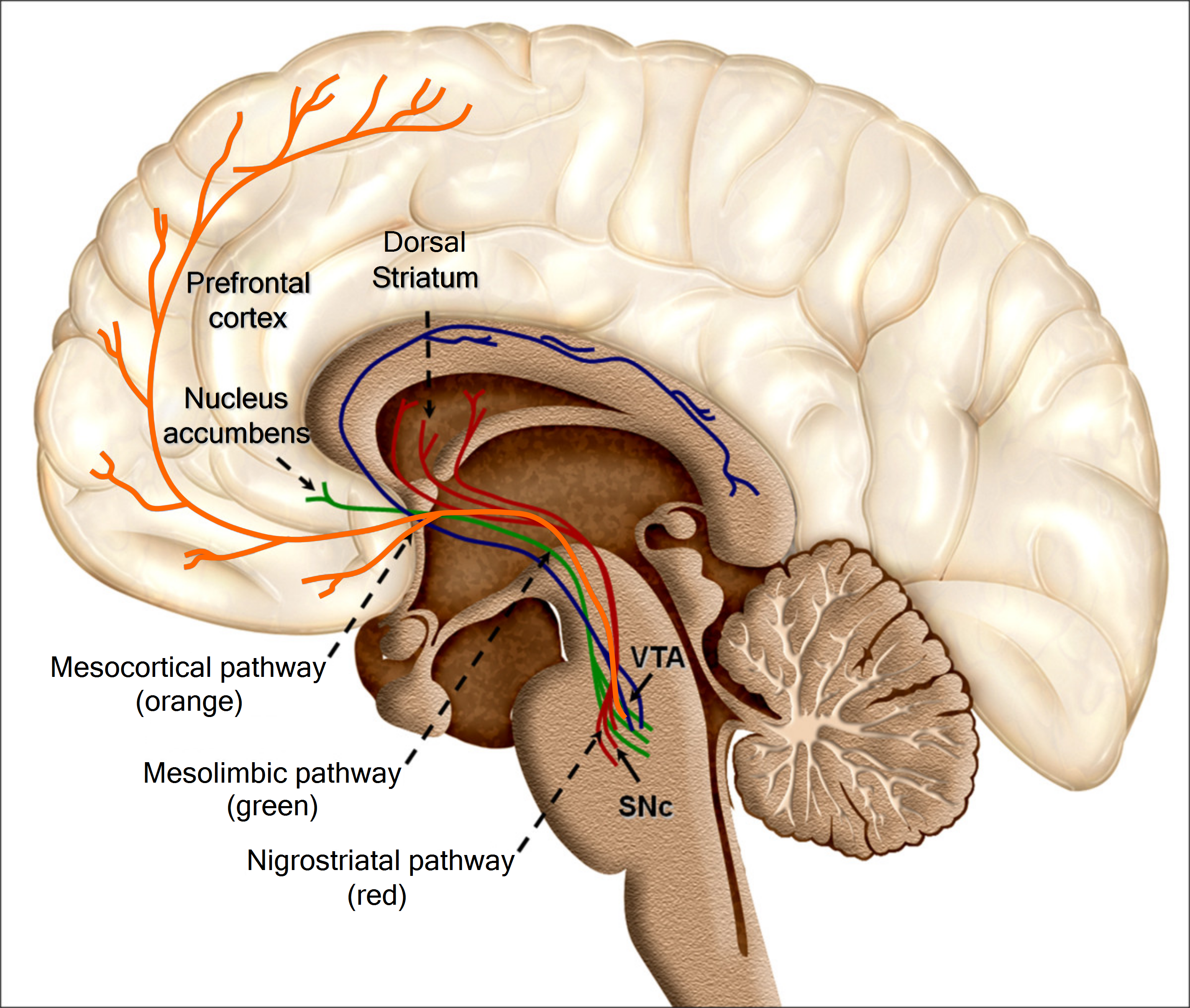
Social connection activates the reward system of the brain.

While it appears that social isolation triggers a "neural alarm system" of threat-related regions of the brain (including the amygdala, dorsal anterior cingulate cortex (dACC), anterior insula, and periaqueductal gray (PAG)), separate regions may process social connection. Two brain areas that are part of the brain's reward system are also involved in processing social connection and attention to loved ones: the ventromedial prefrontal cortex (VMPFC), a region that also responds to safety and inhibits threat responding, and the ventral striatum (VS) and septal area (SA), part of a neural system that is activated by taking care of one's own young.

=== Key neurochemicals ===
==== Opioids ====
In 1978, neuroscientist Jaak Panksepp observed that small doses of opiates reduced the distressed cries of puppies that were separated from their mothers. As a result, he developed the brain opioid theory of attachment, which posits that endogenous (internally produced) opioids underlie the pleasure that social animals derive from social connection, especially within close relationships. Extensive animal research supports this theory. Mice who have been genetically modified to not have mu-opioid receptors (mu-opioid receptor knockout mice), as well as sheep with their mu-receptors blocked temporarily following birth, do not recognize or bond with their mother. When separated from their mother and conspecifics, rats, chicks, puppies, guinea pigs, sheep, dogs, and primates emit distress vocalizations, however giving them morphine (i.e. activating their opioid receptors), quiets this distress. Endogenous opioids appear to be produced when animals engage in bonding behavior, while inhibiting the release of these opioids results in signs of social disconnection. In humans, blocking mu-opioid receptors with the opioid antagonist naltrexone has been found to reduce feelings of warmth and affection in response to a film clip about a moment of bonding, and to increase feelings of social disconnection towards loved ones in daily life as well as in the lab in response to a task designed to elicit feelings of connection. Although the human research on opioids and bonding behavior is mixed and ongoing, this suggests that opioids may underlie feelings of social connection and bonding in humans as well.

==== Oxytocin ====
In mammals, oxytocin has been found to be released during childbirth, breastfeeding, sexual stimulation, bonding, and in some cases stress. In 1992, Sue Carter discovered that administering oxytocin to prairie voles would accelerate their monogamous pair-bonding behavior. Oxytocin has also been found to play many roles in the bonding between mother and child. In addition to pair-bonding and motherhood, oxytocin has been found to play a role in prosocial behavior and bonding in humans. Nicknamed the "love drug" or "cuddle chemical," plasma levels of oxytocin increase following physical affection, and are linked to more trusting and generous social behavior, positively biased social memory, attraction, and anxiety and hormonal responses. Further supporting a nuanced role in adult human bonding, greater circulating oxytocin over a 24-hour period was associated with greater love and perceptions of partner responsiveness and gratitude, however was also linked to perceptions of a relationship being vulnerable and in danger. Thus oxytocin may play a flexible role in relationship maintenance, supporting both the feelings that bring us closer and the distress and instinct to fight for an intimate bond in peril.

== Health ==
=== Consequences of disconnection ===
A wide range of mammals, including rats, prairie voles, guinea pigs, cattle, sheep, primates, and humans, experience distress and long-term deficits when separated from their parent. In humans, long-lasting health consequences result from early experiences of disconnection. In 1958, John Bowlby observed profound distress and developmental consequences when orphans lacked warmth and love of our first and most important attachments: our parents. Loss of a parent during childhood was found to lead to altered cortisol and sympathetic nervous system reactivity even a decade later, and affect stress response and vulnerability to conflict as a young adult.

In addition to the health consequences of lacking connection in childhood, chronic loneliness at any age has been linked to a host of negative health outcomes. In a meta-analytic review conducted in 2010, results from 308,849 participants across 148 studies found that people with strong social relationships had a 50% greater chance of survival. This effect on mortality is not only on par with one of the greatest risks, smoking, but exceeds many other risk factors such as obesity and physical inactivity. Loneliness has been found to negatively affect the healthy function of nearly every system in the body: the brain, immune system, circulatory and cardiovascular systems, endocrine system, and genetic expression.

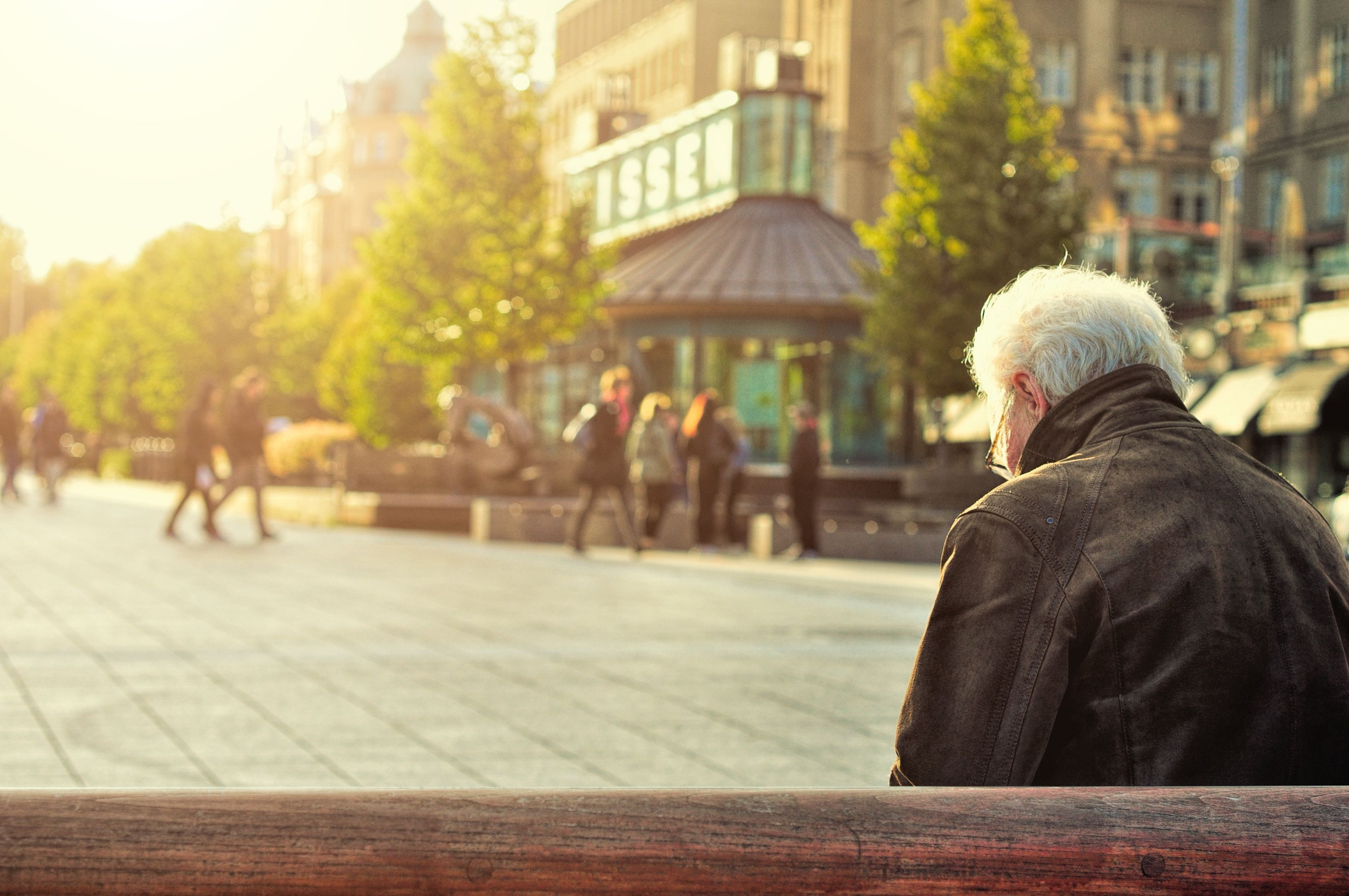
Between 15 and 30% of the general population feels chronic loneliness.

Not only is social isolation harmful to health, but it is more and more common. As many as 80% of young people under 18 years old, and 40% of adults over the age of 65 report being lonely sometimes, and 15–30% of the general population feel chronic loneliness. These numbers appear to be on the rise, and researchers have called for social connection to be public health priority.

=== Social immune system ===
One of the main ways social connection may affect our health is through the immune system. The immune system's primary activity, inflammation, is the body's first line of defense against injury and infection. However, chronic inflammation has been tied to atherosclerosis, Type II diabetes, neurodegeneration, and cancer, as well as compromised regulation of inflammatory gene expression by the brain. Research over the past few decades has revealed that the immune system not only responds to physical threats, but social ones as well. It has become clear that there is a bidirectional relationship between circulating biomarkers of inflammation (e.g. the cytokine IL-6) and feelings of social connection and disconnection; not only are feelings of social isolation linked to increased inflammation, but experimentally induced inflammation alters social behavior and induces feelings of social isolation. This has important health implications. Feelings of chronic loneliness appear to trigger chronic inflammation. However, social connection appears to inhibit inflammatory gene expression and increase antiviral responses. Performing acts of kindness for others were also found to have this effect, suggesting that helping others provides similar health benefits.

Why might our immune system respond to our perceptions of our social world? One theory is that it may have been evolutionarily adaptive for our immune system to "listen" in to our social world to anticipate the kinds of bacterial or microbial threats we face. In our evolutionary past, feeling socially isolated may have meant we were separated from our tribe, and therefore more likely to experience physical injury or wounds, requiring an inflammatory response to heal. On the other hand, feeling connected may have meant we were in relative physical safety of community, but at greater risk of socially transmitted viruses. To meet these threats with greater efficiency, the immune system responds with anticipatory changes. A genetic profile was discovered to initiate this pattern of immune response to social adversity and stress — up-regulation of inflammation, down-regulation of antiviral activity — known as Conserved Transcriptional Response to Adversity. The inverse of this pattern, associated with social connection, has been linked to positive health outcomes as well as eudaemonic well-being.

=== Positive pathways ===
Social connection and support have been found to reduce the physiological burden of stress and contribute to health and well-being through several other pathways as well, although there remains a subject of ongoing research. One way social connection reduces our stress response is by inhibiting activity in our pain and alarm neural systems. Brain areas that respond to social warmth and connection (notably, the septal area) have inhibitory connections to the amygdala, which have the structural capacity to reduce threat responding.

Another pathway by which social connection positively affects health is through the parasympathetic nervous system (PNS), the "rest and digest" system which parallels and offsets the "flight or fight" sympathetic nervous system (SNS). Flexible PNS activity, indexed by vagal tone, helps regulate the heart rate and has been linked to a healthy stress response as well as numerous positive health outcomes. Vagal tone has been found to predict both positive emotions and social connectedness, which in turn result in increased vagal tone, in an "upward spiral" of well-being. Social connection often occurs along with and causes positive emotions, which themselves benefit our health.

== Measures ==
Social Connectedness Scale

This scale was designed to measure general feelings of social connectedness as an essential component of belongingness. Items on the Social Connectedness Scale reflect feelings of emotional distance between the self and others, and higher scores reflect more social connectedness.

UCLA Loneliness Scale

Measuring feelings of social isolation or disconnection can be helpful as an indirect measure of feelings of connectedness. This scale is designed to measure loneliness, defined as the distress that results when one feels disconnected from others.

Relationship Closeness Inventory (RCI)

This measure conceptualizes closeness in a relationship as a high level of interdependence in two people's activities, or how much influence they have over one another. It correlates moderately with self-reports of closeness, measured using the Subjective Closeness Index (SCI).

Liking and Loving Scales

These scales were developed to measure the difference between liking and loving another person—critical aspects of closeness and connection. Good friends were found to score highly on the liking scale, and only romantic partners scored highly on the loving scale. They support Zick Rubin's conceptualization of love as containing three main components: attachment, caring, and intimacy.

Personal Acquaintance Measure (PAM)

This measure identifies six components that can help determine the quality of a person's interactions and feelings of social connectedness with others:

1. Duration of relationship
2. Frequency of interaction with the other person
3. Knowledge of the other person's goals
4. Physical intimacy or closeness with the other person
5. Self-disclosure to the other person
6. Social network familiarity—how familiar is the other person with the rest of your social circle

== Experimental manipulations ==
Social connection is a unique, elusive, person-specific quality of our social world. Yet, can it be manipulated? This is a crucial question for how it can be studied, and whether it can be intervened on in a public health context. There are at least two approaches that researchers have taken to manipulate social connection in the lab:

Social connection task

This task was developed at UCLA by Tristen Inagaki and Naomi Eisenberger to elicit feelings of social connection in the laboratory. It consists of collecting positive and neutral messages from 6 loved ones of a participant, and presenting them to the participant in the laboratory. Feelings of connection and neural activity in response to this task have been found to rely on endogenous opioid activity.

Closeness-generating procedure

Arthur Aron at the State University of New York at Stony Brook and collaborators designed a series of questions designed to generate interpersonal closeness between two individuals who have never met. It consists of 36 questions that subject pairs ask each other over a 45-minute period. It was found to generate a degree of closeness in the lab, and can be more carefully controlled than connection within existing relationships.

== See also ==
- Affection
- Attachment theory
- Friendship
- Interpersonal relationships
- Interpersonal ties
- Interpersonal emotion regulation
- Intimate relationships
- Human bonding
- Love
- Social isolation
- Social robot
- Social support
