= Fundación Arco Iris =

Fundacion Arco Iris (Rainbow Foundation)
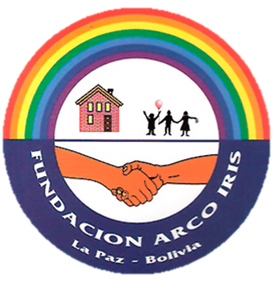
- Purpose: Education, motivation, opportunities
- Location: La Paz, Bolivia
- Region served: Bolivia
- Website: fundacion-arcoiris.org

Fundación Arco Iris (Rainbow Foundation) (NGO) is a Catholic NGO (founded by German priest Jose Maria Neuenhofer in 1994) based in La Paz that fights against the discrimination, marginalization and lack of opportunity that thousands of young people suffer. They focus specifically on orphans, children of the incarcerated, victims of domestic violence, and those who live or work in the streets of La Paz. At present, the Foundation has 8 centers plus a hospital.

== Mission ==
Their mission has three major points: They seek to provide essential support, including food, shelter, medical care, clothing, tutoring and professional training, social support, mental health counseling and legal help. Secondly, they aim to create processes that support stability and self-esteem of each client and foster the independence of each child. Finally, they aim to eradicate the structural causes that produce marginalization, lack of opportunities, ignorance, indifference and the crisis of values. In addressing these needs, they seek to focus on responding to expressed needs instead of constructing a program that imposes a structure on each individual.

== Vision ==
Their vision is that every person regardless of age, race, social condition or gender, by virtue of their dignity is able to be for him/herself a responsible agent of their own well-being, moral progress, and spiritual development.

== Arco Iris projects ==
=== Project Betaña ===
Gran Betaña is one of the poorest neighborhood of La Paz. Arco Iris started Project “Betaña” in 1996, helping more than 200 youngsters each year (from 6 to 14 years old) through educational classrooms, school supplies, dining rooms, sports and medical assistance. There are 10 full-time teachers. The children that go to public school in the morning go to the center after classes, have lunch, spend the afternoon at the center and go to their homes in the evening. Other groups go to the center in the morning and after having lunch they go to school in the afternoon. The center also has a nursery where about 50 younger children get food, medical attention and learning assistance.

=== Casa de Paso ===
The “Caso de Paso” (Pass through House) works in two areas. One group of professionals makes daily visits to the places where homeless children live (in parks, under bridges, cemeteries, etc.) to provide social help (medical, clothing, blankets, food, etc.), recreational and sport activities, and psychological and educational assistance. The “House of Improvement” takes children that leave their life in the streets and helps them to achieve social reintegration. Some of these children are reintegrated into their own families and others are moved to the “Casa Esperanza” or “Obrajes Girls Homes.” The project helps approximately 400 children each year.
