= Self-regulated learning =

Educational strategy

Self-regulated learning (SRL) is one of the domains of self-regulation, and is aligned most closely with educational aims. Broadly speaking, it refers to learning that is guided by metacognition (thinking about one's thinking), strategic action (planning, monitoring, and evaluating personal progress against a standard), and motivation to learn. A self-regulated learner "monitors, directs, and regulates actions toward goals of information acquisition, expanding expertise, and self-improvement". In particular, self-regulated learners are cognizant of their academic strengths and weaknesses, and they have a repertoire of strategies they appropriately apply to tackle the day-to-day challenges of academic tasks. These learners hold incremental beliefs about intelligence (as opposed to entity, or fixed views of intelligence) and attribute their successes or failures to factors (e.g., effort expended on a task, effective use of strategies) within their control.

Finally, self-regulated learners take on challenging tasks, practice their learning, develop a deep understanding of subject matter, and exert effort towards academic success. In part, these characteristics may help to explain why self-regulated learners usually exhibit a high sense of self-efficacy. In the educational psychology literature, researchers have linked these characteristics to success in and beyond school.

Self-regulated learners are successful because they control their learning environment. They exert this control by directing and regulating their own actions toward their learning goals. Self-regulated learning should be used in three different phases of learning. The first phase is during the initial learning, the second phase is when troubleshooting a problem encountered during learning and the third phase is when they are trying to teach others.

== Self-regulated learning in online and higher education ==
Self-regulation is an important construct in student success within an environment that allows learner choice, such as online courses. Within the remained time of explanation, there will be different types of self-regulations such as the focus is the differences between first- and second-generation college students' ability to self-regulate their online learning. A comfort level of using the computer as a control provided evidence that first-generation students report significantly lower levels of self-regulation for online learning than their second-generation counterparts. As to relating to Self-regulation, there are different strategies such as private writing techniques, which is a way as a form of text. It is a way of freewriting and journaling which are underexploited in academic writing instructions. However, it is only seen as a form of prewriting and is criticized for being under-theorized in the significance of writing a social practice that approaches drawing towards the conceptual framework of the conception of learning development. It is estimated that students who are first-year students are discovering new strategies, This can be argued that the transition from secondary to tertiary education can be challenging for students, they must adapt to the independent nature of learning at universities. Learning strategies are rarely taught at universities, making it difficult for students to learn new strategies. The significance is evaluating small-group peer discussion boards as an avenue for sharing learning strategies between students in a first-year anatomy and physiology course. It is believed that students perceive the outlining process, and students in business communication courses were surveyed about their perceptions of outlining. It is said that students were asked about how they outline, whether they outline, and why they outline. The significance was students were able to include organization within the outlining process and include content exploration which made it useful for students whose process included only organization or only content exploration. Leading to the supposition that there is critical analysis in student writing such as functional linguistics being presented. In a way where there were trainee teachers who were asked to write a form of descriptive writing to students attempting critical analysis. Although descriptive writing has an important role in learning for students. It is said that the discussion of critical analysis is realized in student writing. Resulting in the importance of self-regulation in online learning, particularly with first-year and second-year college-generation students. First-generation students tend to report lower levels of self-regulation, in a way as a comfort level with using computers. Strategies such as private writing techniques and peer discussion boards can help students develop effective learning strategies, especially in the transition from secondary to tertiary education. Additionally, the outlining process and critical analysis in student writing are vital components of academic success. Overall, fostering self-regulation and providing support for diverse learning strategies are essential for students' success in online courses.

== Phases of self-regulation ==
According to Winne and Hadwin, self-regulation unfolds over "four flexibly sequenced phases of recursive cognition." These phases are task perception, goal setting and planning, enacting, and adaptation.

- During the task perception phase, students gather information about the task at hand and personalize their perception of it. This stage involves determining motivational states, self-efficacy, and information about the environment around them.
- Next, students set goals and plan how to accomplish the task. Several goals may be set concerning explicit behaviors, cognitive engagement, and motivation changes. The goals that are set depend on how the students perceive the task at hand.
- The students will then enact the plan they have developed by using study skills and other useful tactics they have in their repertoire of learning strategies.
- The last phase is an adaptation, wherein students evaluate their performance and determine how to modify their strategy in order to achieve higher performance in the future. They may change their goals or their plan; they may also choose not to attempt that particular task again. Winne and Hadwin state that all academic tasks encompass these four phases.

Zimmerman suggested that self-regulated learning process has three stages:

1. Forethought, learners' preparing work before the performance on their studying;
2. Volitional control, which is also called "performance control", occurs in the learning process. It involves learners' attention and willpower;
3. Self-reflection happens in the final stage when learners review their performance toward final goals. Focusing on one's learning strategies during the process also helps towards achieving the learning outcomes.

Baba and Nitta (2015) demonstrated that Zimmerman's cyclical self-regulatory processes can be extended to longer periods of time and self-reflection has a close connection to second language writing development. From a Complex Dynamic Systems Theory perspective, Wind and Harding (2020) found that attractor states might negatively affect the cyclicality of self-regulatory processes.

== Sources of self-regulated learning ==
According to Iran-Nejhad and Chissom, there are three sources of self-regulated learning: active/executive, dynamic, and interest-creating discovery model (1992).

Active/executive self-regulation is regulated by the person and is intentional, deliberate, conscious, voluntary, and strategic. The individual is aware and effortful in using self-regulation strategies. Under this source of SRL, learning happens best in a habitual mode of functioning.

Dynamic self-regulation is also known as unintentional learning because it is regulated by internal subsystems other than the "central executive". The learner is not consciously aware they are learning because it occurs "outside the direct influence of deliberate internal control."

The third source of self-regulated learning is the interest-creating discovery module, which is described as "bifunctional" as it is developed from both the active and dynamic models of self-regulation. In this model, learning takes place best in a creative mode of functioning and is neither completely person-driven nor unconscious, but a combination of both.

== Social cognitive perspective ==
Self-regulation from the social cognitive perspective looks at the triadic interaction between the person (e.g., beliefs about success), their behavior (e.g., engaging in a task), and the environment (e.g., feedback from a teacher). Zimmerman et al. specified three important characteristics of self-regulated learning:

1. self-observation (monitoring one's activities); seen as the most important of these processes
2. self-judgment (self-evaluation of one's performance) and
3. self-reactions (reactions to performance outcomes).

To the extent that one accurately reflects about one's progress towards a learning goal, and appropriately adjusts the actions to be performed in order to maximize performance and foreseeable outcome; effectively, at this point, one's self has become self-regulated. During a student's school career, the primary goal of teachers is to produce self-regulated learners by using such theories as the Information Processing Model (IPM). By storing the information into long-term memory (or a live document like a Runbook) the learner can retrieve it upon demand and apply meta-learning to tasks, and thereby become a self-regulated learner.

== Information processing perspective ==
Winne and Marx posited that motivational thoughts and beliefs are governed by the basic principles of cognitive psychology, which should be conceived in information-processing terms. Motivation plays a major role in self-regulated learning. Motivation is needed to apply effort and continue on when faced with difficulty. Control also plays a role in self-regulated learning as it helps the learner to stay on track in reaching their learning goal and avoid being distracted from things that stand in the way of the learning goal.

== Student performance perspective ==
Lovett, Meyer and Thille observed comparable student performance between instructor-led and self-regulated learning environments. In a subsequent study, self-regulated learning was shown to enable accelerated learning while maintaining long-term retention rates.

Cassandra B. Whyte noted the importance of internal locus of control tendencies on successful academic performance, also compatible with self-regulated learning. Whyte recognized and appreciated external factors, to include the benefit of working with a good teacher, while encouraging self-regulated hard work, skill-building, and a positive attitude to perform better in academic situations.

To increase positive attitudes and academic performance, expert learners should be created. Expert learners develop self-regulated learning strategies. One of these strategies is the ability to develop and ask questions and use these questions to expand on their own prior knowledge. This technique allows the learners to test the true understanding of their knowledge and make correction about content areas that have a misunderstanding. When learners engage in questioning, it forces them to be more actively engaged in their learning. It also allows them to self analyze and determine their level of comprehension.

This active engagement allows the learner to organize concepts into existing schemas. Through the use of questions, learners can accommodate and then assimilate their new knowledge with existing schema. This process allows the learner to solve novel problems and when the existing schema does not work on the novel problem the learner must reevaluate and assess their level of understanding.

== Application in practice ==
There are many practical applications for self-regulated learning in schools and classrooms. Paris and Paris state there are three main areas of direct application in classrooms: literacy instruction, cognitive engagement, and self-assessment. In the area of literacy instruction, educators can teach students the skills necessary to lead them to become self-regulated learners by using strategies such as reciprocal teaching, open-ended tasks, and project-based learning.

Other tasks that promote self-regulated learning are authentic assessments, autonomy-based assignments, and portfolios. These strategies are student-centered and inquiry-based, which cause students to gradually become more autonomous, creating an environment of self-regulated learning. However, students do not simply need to know the strategies, but they need to realize the importance of utilizing them in order to experience academic success.

According to Dweck and Master, "Students' use of learning strategies – and their continued use of them in the face of difficulty – is based on the beliefs that these strategies are necessary for learning, and that they are effective ways of overcoming obstacles." Students who are not self-regulated learners may daydream, rarely complete assignments, or forget assignments completely. Those who do practice self-regulation ask questions, take notes, allocate their time effectively, and use resources available to them. Pajares lists several practices of successful students that Zimmerman and his colleagues developed in his chapter of Motivation and Self-Regulated Learning: Theory, Research, and Applications.

These behaviors include, but are not limited to: finishing homework assignments by deadlines, studying when there are other interesting things to do, concentrating on school subjects, taking useful class notes of class instruction, using the library for information for class assignments, effectively planning schoolwork, effectively organizing schoolwork, remembering information presented in class and textbooks, arranging a place to study at home without distractions, motivating oneself to do schoolwork, and participating in class discussions.

Examples of self-regulated learning strategies in practice:

- Self-assessment: Students can self-assess their performance on a task during the evaluation phase of self-regulated learning. This can help students to plan their further learning based on what they know and what they do not know. If the self-assessment is criteria-referenced, it allows students to internalize criteria/standards of learning so they can regulate their own learning. For example, self-assessing one's scientific and alternative conceptions of science topics with a criteria-list can help to regulate these conceptions in the future, i.e., use scientific conceptions and avoid alternative conceptions.
- Wrapper activity: activity based on pre-existing learning or assessment task. This can be done as a homework assignment. Consist of self-assessment questions to complete before completing homework and then after the completion of homework. This will allow the learner to draw their own conclusions about the learning process.
- Think aloud: This involves the teacher describing their thought process in solving a problem.
- Questioning: Following new material, student develops questions about the material.
- Reciprocal teaching: the learner teaches new material to fellow learners.
- Help-seeking

Self-regulation has recently been studied in relation to certain age and socioeconomic groups. Programs such as CSRP target different groups in order to increase effortful control in the classroom to enhance early learning.

== Measurement ==
There are two perspectives on how to measure student self-regulation behaviour. First, the perspective sees SRL as an aptitude. This perspective measures the regulation behaviour based on the perception of the student about their regulation behaviour. The instrument that is frequently used in this perspective is a questionnaire. The second perspective sees SRL as an event which can be measured by observing the actual behaviour of the student. The most commonly used methods of measurement in this perspective are the think-aloud protocol and direct observation.

== Evaluation ==
A qualitative study reported that learners use SRL effectively when provided with enhanced guided notes (EGN) instead of standard guided notes (SGN) by the instructor. Moreover, students tend to use shallow level processing strategies such as rote memorization, rehearsal, and reviewing notes which are largely related to the learning cultures that they have been exposed to. However, other learning contexts encourage social influences such as group work and social assistance as ways of developing SRL through reciprocal interaction which facilitates self-reflection. Therefore, it is a challenge for researchers to develop a suitable framework to evaluate SRL, as learners tend to use some strategies over others with specific focus on SRL in different contexts.

== See also ==
- Corrective feedback
- Educational psychology
- Learning by teaching
- Meta learning
- Reflective practice
- Self (psychology)
- Self-efficacy
