= Invisible support =

In psychology, invisible support is a type of social support in which supportive exchanges are not visible to recipients.

There are two possible situations that can qualify as acts of invisible support. The first possibility entails a situation where "recipients are completely unaware of the supportive transaction between themselves and support-givers". For example, a spouse may choose to spontaneously take care of housework without mentioning it to the other couple-member. Invisible support also occurs when "recipients are aware of an act that takes place but do not interpret the act as a supportive exchange". In this case, a friend or family member may subtly provide advice in an indirect manner as a means to preserve the recipient's self-esteem or to defer his or her attention from a stressful situation. Invisible support can be viewed on both ends of an exchange, in which the recipient is unaware of the support received and the provider enacts support in a skillful, subtle way.

== Background ==
It is known that perceptions of social support availability predict better adjustment to stressful life events; it has been found that the perception of support availability is inherently comforting, and can serve as a psychological safety-net that motivates self-reliant coping efforts in the face of stress. Although the perception of support availability is associated with better adjustment, the knowledge that one has been the recipient of specific supportive acts has often been unhelpful to effectively reduce stress. The knowledge of receiving help may come at a cost with decreased feelings of self-esteem and self-efficacy, because it increases recipients' awareness towards their personal difficulties to manage stressors. People's well-intentioned support attempts may also be miscarried, and their efforts could either fail or even worsen the situation for a person under stress. Since supportive acts benefit recipients but their actual knowledge of receiving support is sometimes harmful, it has been theorized that the most effective support exchange would involve one in which the provider reports giving support but the recipient does not notice that support has occurred. From a cost-benefit point of view, invisible support would be optimal for the recipient because the benefits of provision are accrued while the costs of receipt are avoided. Using the same idea, it also implies that the least effective type of support would be one in which the provider does not report providing support but the recipient reports receiving it.

The first investigation of invisible support involved a couples study in which one member was preparing for the New York State Bar Exam. Support receipt and provision were measured by having both couple members complete daily diary entries. Over the course of one month, stressed individuals who reported low frequency of received support (but whose partner ranked his or her own actions as highly supportive) rated themselves low on anxiety and depression compared to other individuals who reported high frequency of received support.

== Compared to visible support ==
A substantial body of work has evidence to suggest that support is most effective when it is invisible or goes unnoticed by recipients. While invisible support has been shown to benefit recipients over visibly supportive acts in some cases, there have also been instances where recipients have benefitted from visible support as well. For example, greater observed support enacted by intimate partners during couples' support-relevant exchanges have been shown to build feelings of closeness and support, boost positive mood and self-esteem, and foster greater goal achievement and relationship quality across time. It has been recently suggested that acts of invisible support and visible support may be beneficial or costly depending on different circumstances. To investigate this idea, a recent study in 2013 compared the short-term and long-term effects of visible and invisible support reception during romantic couples' discussions of each partner's personal goal. It was found that either type of support was more beneficial depending on the emotional distress that recipients felt at the time. Visible emotional support (support through reassurance, encouragement, and understanding) was associated with perceptions of greater support and discussion success for recipients who felt greater distress during the discussion. In contrast, invisible emotional support was not associated with recipients' post-discussion perceptions of support or discussion success. For long-term support effects, it was found that only invisible emotional support predicted greater goal achievement across the following year. When put together, these findings suggest that visible support and invisible support have unique functions for well-being. When people are under distress, visible support appears to be a short-term remedy to reassure recipients that they are cared for and supported. These benefits are only present when recipients are actually distressed during the time that the supportive act takes place. On the other hand, while invisible support tends to go unnoticed by recipients, it seems to play an integral role in the long-term success of goal-maintenance. This increasingly complex view of the implications of support visibility is reinforced by a growing body of research suggesting the effects of invisible social support–as with visible support–are moderated by provider, recipient, and contextual factors such as recipients' perceptions of providers' responsiveness to their needs, or the quality of the relationship between the support provider and recipient.

== Effects on support providers ==
The effects of invisible support on recipients have been extensively investigated, but the consequences of invisible support on providers are less known. One study in 2016 investigated the benefits and costs of invisible support on couple-members who enacted supportive behaviors by differentiating the processes of invisible emotional support (support through reassurance, encouragement, and understanding) from processes of invisible instrumental support (providing tangible aid such as sending money or childcare). No costs of support-giving were found for providers when they demonstrated acts of invisible emotional support. The effects for invisible instrumental support told a different story, where providers who reported high relationship satisfaction were unaffected, but providers who reported low relationship satisfaction were negatively affected by their acts of invisible instrumental support with an increase in negative mood. These findings suggest that emotional comfort may be a more central function to maintain close relationships than instrumental support. Therefore, providing invisible emotional support may lead to less perceptions of a costly inequity than providing invisible instrumental support on average. However, since invisible instrumental support did not incur costs for providers who reported high relationship satisfaction, it implies that high relationship satisfaction may buffer potential costs that would otherwise be felt by support-providers. The differential results between invisible instrumental and emotional support indicate that a solid distinction between instrumental and emotional social support may be useful to take into account when investigating effects of invisible support as a whole.
