= Social Support Questionnaire =

The Social Support Questionnaire (SSQ) is a quantitative, psychometrically sound survey questionnaire intended to measure social support and satisfaction with said social support from the perspective of the interviewee. Degree of social support has been shown to influence the onset and course of certain psychiatric disorders such as clinical depression or schizophrenia. The SSQ was approved for public release in 1981 by Irwin Sarason, Henry Levine, Robert Basham and Barbara Sarason under the University of Washington Department of Psychology and consists of 27 questions. Overall, the SSQ has good test-retest reliability and convergent internal construct validity.

== Overview ==
The questionnaire is designed so that each question has a two-part answer. The first part asks the interviewee to list up to nine people available to provide support that meet the criteria stated in the question. These support individuals are specified using their initials in addition to the relationship to the interviewee. Example questions from the first part includes questions such as "Whom could you count on to help if you had just been fired from your job or expelled from school?" and "Whom do you feel would help if a family member very close to you died?".

The second part asks the interviewee to specify how satisfied they are with each of the people stated in the first part. The SSQ respondents use a 6 -point Likert scale to indicate their degree of satisfaction with the support from the above people ranging from "1 - very dissatisfied" to "6 - very satisfied".

The Social Support Questionnaire has multiple short forms such as the SSQ3 and the SSQ6.

== History ==
The SSQ is based on 4 original studies. The first study set out to determine whether the SSQ had the desired psychometric properties. The second study tried to relate SSQ and a diversity of personality measures such as anxiety, depression and hostility in connection with the Multiple Affect Adjective Checklist. The third study considered the relationship between social support, the prior year's negative and positive life events, internal-external locus of control and self- esteem in conjunction with the Life Experiences Survey. The fourth study tested the idea that social support could serve as a buffer when faced with difficult life situations via trying to solve a maze and subsequently completing the Cognitive Interference Questionnaire.

== Scoring ==
The overall support score (SSQN) is calculated by taking an average of the individual scores across the 27 items. A high score on the SSQ indicates more optimism about life than a low score. Respondents with low SSQ scores have a higher prevalence of negative life events and illness. Scoring is as follows:

1. Add the total number of people for all 27 items (questions). (Max. is 243). Divide by 27 for average item score. This gives you SSQ Number Score, or SSQN.

2. Add the total satisfaction scores for all 27 items (questions). (Max is 162). Divide by 27 for average item score. This gives you SSQ Satisfaction score or SSQS.

3. Finally, you can average the above for the total number of people that are family members - this results in the SSQ family score.

== Reliability ==
According to Sarason, the SSQ takes between fifteen and eighteen minutes to properly administer and has "good" test-retest reliability.

== Validity ==
The SSQ was compared with the depression scale and validity tests show significant negative correlation ranging from -0.22 to -0.43. The SSQ and the optimism scale have a correlation of 0.57. The SSQ and the satisfaction score have a correlation of 0.34. The SSQ has high internal consistency among items.

== Linkages ==
The SSQ has been used to show that higher levels of social support correlated with less suicide ideation in Military Medical University Soldiers in Iran in 2015. A low level of social support is an important risk factor in women for dysmenorrhea or menstrual cramps. Low Social Support is the strongest predictor of dysmenorrhea when compared to affect, personality and alexithymia.

== Related surveys ==
=== SSQ3 ===
The SSQ3 is a short form of the SSQ and has only three questions. The SSQ3 has acceptable test-test reliability and correlation with personality variables as compared to the long form of the Social Support Questionnaire. The internal reliability was borderline but this low level of internal reliability is as expected since there are only three questions.

=== SSQ6 ===
The SSQ6 is a short form of the SSQ. The SSQ6 has been shown to have high correlation with: the SSQ, SSQ personality variables and internal reliability. In the development of the SSQ6, the research suggests that professed social support in adults may be a connected to "early attachment experience." The SSQ6 consists of the below 6 questions:

1. Whom can you really count on to be dependable when you need help?

2. Whom can you really count on to help you feel more relaxed when you are under pressure or tense?

3. Who accepts you totally, including both your worst and your best points?

4. Whom can you really count on to care about you, regardless of what is happening to you?

5. Whom can you really count on to help you feel better when you are feeling generally down-in-the-dumps?

6. Whom can you count on to console you when you are very upset?

=== Interpersonal Support Evaluation List (ISEL) ===
The Interpersonal Support Evaluation List includes 40 items (questions) with four sub-scales in the areas of Tangible Support, Belonging Support, Self-Esteem Support and Appraisal Support. The interviewee rates each item based on how true or false they feel the item is for themselves. The four total response options are "Definitely True", "Probably True", "Probably False", and "Definitely False".

== See also ==
- Social support
- Peer support
- Psychological stress
- Occupational stress
- Perceived organizational support
