= Help-seeking =

Theory in psychology

Help-seeking theory postulates that people follow a series of predictable steps to seek help for their inadequacies. It is a series of well-ordered and purposeful cognitive and behavioral steps, each leading to specific types of solutions.

Help-seeking theory falls into two categories where some consider similarity in the processes (e.g. Cepeda-Benito & Short, 1998) while others consider it as dependent upon the problem (e.g. Di Fabio & Bernaud, 2008). In general help-seeking behaviors are dependent upon three categories: attitudes (beliefs and willingness) towards help-seeking, intention to seek help, and actual help-seeking behavior.

Help-seeking was, "in the early studies of socialization and personality development", often viewed as an indicator of dependency and therefore took "on connotations of immaturity, passivity, and even incompetence". Now, there is general agreement that adaptive help-seeking is an important and effective self-regulated learning strategy.

== Definition ==
The academic literature does not provide an agreed upon definition of help-seeking, and several attempts have been made to define the complex construct. Help-seeking has been studied both as a self-regulated learning strategy and as a coping strategy. In the mental health context, help-seeking can be defined as "an adaptive coping process that is the attempt to obtain external assistance to deal with a mental health concern." In the educational context, help-seeking can be "defined as a learning (or problem-solving) strategy where a learner attempts to obtain external assistance to deal with difficulties experienced while working towards one (or more) educational goal(s)."

=== Adaptive vs. maladaptive help-seeking ===
Help-seeking behavior is divided into two types, adaptive and non-adaptive behavior. It is adaptive when exercised to overcome a difficulty and it depends upon the person's recognition, insight and dimension of the problem and resources for solving the same; this is valued as an active strategy. It is non-adaptive when the behavior persists even after understanding and experiencing the problem-solving mechanism and when used for avoidance. Dynamic barriers in seeking help can also affect active process (e.g., culture, ego, classism, etc.).

Nelson-Le Gall (1981) made a central differentiation between adaptive (i.e. instrumental) and maladaptive (i.e. executive) forms of help-seeking. While adaptive help-seeking focuses on mastery and understanding (i.e. to seek just enough help to be able to solve a problem or attain a goal), maladaptive help-seeking involves avoidance of work (i.e. to request someone else to solve a problem or attain a goal on one's behalf).

== The help-seeking process model ==
Several theoretical models have conceptualised help-seeking as a multistep process with distinct stages. The help-seeking process model categorises the complex help-seeking process as comprising eight distinct stages: (1) determine there is a problem; (2) determine that help is needed; (3) decide to seek help; (4) select the goal of the help-seeking; (5) select the source of help; (6) solicit help; (7) obtain the requested help; and (8) process the help received.

Although the help-seeking process model presents the help-seeking process with distinct and logically sequential stages, in practice it is a dynamic and iterative hermeneutic process where the movements between the different stages are interrelated and non-linear. Deciding on a helping source could, for instance, precede the decision to seek help.

The help-seeking process model can be mapped onto Zimmerman's (2000) model of self-regulated learning, which comprises three phases: forethought, performance, and self-reflection processes. The first five stages of the help-seeking process model comprise the forethought phase of Zimmerman's (2000) model, soliciting help and obtaining the requested help comprise the performance phase, while processing the received help is considered the self-reflection phase of the help-seeking process.

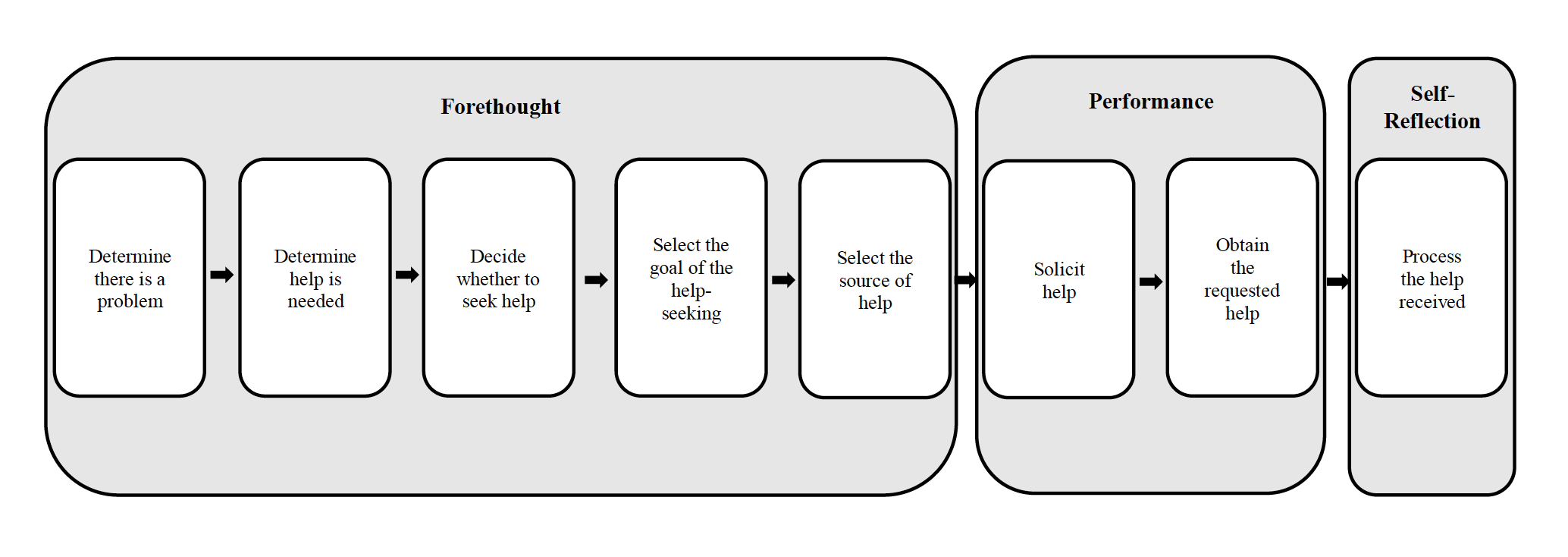
The help-seeking process model mapped onto Zimmerman's model of self-regulated learning

=== Determine there is a problem ===
The initial stage of the help-seeking process model involves recognising difficulties and defining them as a problem. The mere recognition of some difficulty is often insufficient to lead to action, and an individual must further identify the difficulty as problematic before seeking outside help. Implicit ideas about what constitutes comprehension or performance vary between individuals and groups of people. As a consequence, there is considerable variation across individuals to the types and qualities of problems that receive attention and generate sufficient concern to seek help.

=== Determine help is needed ===
Once identified, a problem must further be perceived as amenable to aid. The second stage of the help-seeking process model involves recognising that seeking help is an appropriate way of dealing with the problem at hand. In other words, a learner has to decide whether or not help is needed or wanted. Determining that help is needed depends on several factors, including the perception of insufficient personal resources, whether other strategies have been exhausted, and attributions for why problems exists that are help-relevant.

=== Decide whether to seek help ===
The decision stage of the help-seeking process involves deciding on whether or not to seek assistance by weighing different self-motivation beliefs, including self-efficacy (i.e. the belief that one can marshal the resources to seek the desired help), outcome expectations (i.e. the belief that doing so will result in the desired outcome), and task value.

Several methods have been utilised to systematically investigate the decision stage of the help-seeking process, such as examining the attitudes and beliefs people have regarding help-seeking, underlying intentions and motivations for seeking help, as well as past help-seeking behaviour.

==== Perceived benefits vs threats ====
Unlike many other self-regulated learning strategies (e.g. memorisation, organisation, and elaboration), help-seeking may require a complex balancing of perceived enticing benefits and intimidating costs. The perceived benefits (or "positive attitudes") of help-seeking reflect a recognition of help-seeking as an instrumental and pragmatic means of learning (e.g. "I believe that asking my teachers questions helps me learn"). In contrast, the perceived threats (or "negative attitudes") of help-seeking reflect either a threat to self-esteem caused by the perceived inadequacy or the sociocultural norms that inveigh against seeking assistance (e.g. "I believe the teachers might think I am dumb if I ask a question in class").

Help-seeking is the only self-regulated learning strategy that is potentially stigmatising due to its perceived personal costs.

=== Select the goal of the help-seeking ===
Once the decision has been taken to seek help, a learner needs to assign a purpose or meaning to the assistance seeking. Help-seeking motives can take many forms, and consequently there are different ways of categorising help-seeking goals.

Adaptive help-seeking involves improving one's capabilities and/or increasing one's understanding by seeking just enough help to be able to solve a problem or attain a goal independently. Adaptive help-seeking can, for example, involve students asking for hints about the solution to problems, examples of similar problems, or clarification of the problem at hand. Emotional help-seeking is a multifaceted construct, where the goal is to reduce or manage emotional distress, e.g. by getting moral support, sympathy or understanding. While adaptive help-seeking focuses on understanding and capabilities, the goal of maladaptive help-seeking is to avoid effort, i.e. requesting someone else to solve a problem or attain a goal on one's behalf (e.g. by asking for solutions or answers to problems). Avoidance of help-seeking refers to instances when students require help but do not seek it, e.g. a student might skip a problem altogether or put down any answer rather than ask for help.

=== Select the source of help ===
A central part of the help-seeking process is identifying and considering available sources of help. Many factors, such as personal characteristics of the help-seeker and the helping source, as well as situational characteristics of the helping context can determine the perceptions help-seekers have of helping sources and subsequently influence which sources they choose to solicit aid from. Help can be sought from a wide variety of sources. As a consequence, there are multiple ways of categorising sources of help.

==== Framework for distinguishing sources of help ====
Makara and Karabenick's (2013) proposed framework for distinguishing sources of help characterises helping sources according to four dichotomous dimensions: (1) role, i.e. formal versus informal; (2) relationship, i.e. personal versus impersonal; (3) channel, i.e. mediated versus face-to-face; and (4) adaptability, i.e. dynamic versus static.

The role dimension indicates whether the source's function requires help to be offered. The perceived relationship between the help seeker and the helping source can be distinguished into sources that are perceived to be personal and those judged to be more impersonal. The channel used to access the helping source distinguishes between sources in which the help is distributed face-to-face and those in which the distribution of help is mediated via some form of technology – that is, through any tool or instrument (e.g. books, phones, computers). The adaptability dimension categorises sources as either dynamic or static. Dynamic sources adapt or change over time based on a learner's help-seeking needs (e.g. instructors), while static sources cannot (e.g. textbooks and encyclopaedias). The helping source framework acknowledges how various aspects of sources may influence help-seeking.

=== Solicit help ===
Once a potential helping source has been identified, the help-seeker must enlist the help. This stage of the help-seeking process concerns the content or form of the request for help – i.e. how to request help. Overt help-seeking involves the employment of various help-seeking strategies for engaging a source's help (e.g. expressing a question at a particular time with a particular tone). Help-seeking is – apart from peer learning – the only self-regulated learning strategy that is potentially social in nature, and in many instances learners need to possess appropriate social skills for seeking help from a variety of sources. The help solicitation process requires social competencies, including the knowledge and skills to approach a helping source for the desired help in ways that are socially desirable.

=== Obtain the requested help ===
If a help-seeker is successful in soliciting help from a targeted helping source, the next stage of the help-seeking process involves gaining or acquiring the help that has been requested. Obtaining the requested help involves the help-seeker integrating the new information with existing knowledge and evaluating the quality of the received help. After having received help, a learner must decide to what degree the help is useful and addresses the experienced difficulties. If the assistance falls short in alleviating the difficulties, a learner must request further help or will possibly have to identify a new helper.

=== Process the help received ===
An important aspect of help-seeking – and self-regulated learning in general – is the utilising of skills and strategies in order to process the received help. In Zimmerman's (2000) self-regulation model, this identified self-reflection phase is manifested by the two self-reflective processes self-judgment and self-reactions. While self-judgment entails self-evaluating one's performance and attributing causal significance to the outcome, self-reactions refer to the comparison of self-monitored information and a standard or goal.

== Public health ==
Help-seeking behavior in public health is divided into following steps:

- Self-care: Self-evaluation and self-administration for the physical or psychological problem.
- Social networks: Seeking information to eradicate the problem through community resources.
- Helpers: Seeking help from informal (priest, holistic healers, pharmacists, etc.) and formal helpers (physicians, psychologists, social workers, etc.) related to the field.
- Gatekeepers: They are incoming form of help from the community by understanding the presence of problem and they are resourceful members of a community who can link/direct the person in need with potential sources of help.

== Psychological investigations ==
With adaptive help-seeking, students can comprehend concepts and complete learning tasks, which are otherwise not achievable with their own efforts. It may therefore be taken for granted that students will ask for help when they experience academic difficulties that they cannot solve independently. However, many students do not seek help when they would benefit from it. Indeed, students who are expected to benefit the most from help are also the ones least likely to seek it.

Multitudinous factors can influence a help-seeking process, such as the sociocultural context, individual differences, etc. Research has shown that culture may influence help-seeking. For example, many Asian cultures have cultural values rooted in Confucianism and Buddhism which emphasise interdependence and collectivism, as opposed to many Western cultures where independence and individualism is prevalent. Research has identified personality-related predispositions to be important predictors of help-seeking.

Help-seeking has received a lot of research attention in academic contexts. Karabenick & Newman, 2006 Help-seeking behaviors are often linked to goal-orientation theory, with mastery-oriented students being more likely to manifest adaptive strategies and performance-oriented students being more likely to manifest non-adaptive strategies (Ames, 1983; Butler, 1999, 2006; Hashim, 2004; Ryan, Gheen, & Midgley, 1998). Several researchers have found that women have significantly more positive attitudes than men towards seeking help from professional psychologists. Shea & Yeh, 2008 When facing need, students with high self-efficacy tend to manifest high help-seeking behavior, whereas students with low self-efficacy are, under similar circumstances, more reluctant to seek help (Linnenbrink & Pintrich, 2003; Nelson & Ketelhut, 2008; Paulsen & Feldman, 2005; Pintrich & Zusho, 2007; Tan et al., 2008). In 2011 it was reexamined and peer-reviewed that affiliation cues can prime people to seek help in closed group contexts.

Adaptive help-seeking can result in benefits not only for help-seekers, but also for help-givers and potential bystanders. Help-seeking and help-giving can for example be in the form of elaboration, a cognitive learning strategy that involves making information meaningful and building connections between existing knowledge and the information one has been given. Elaboration strategies such as question-asking and question-answering can result in deeper processing of the learning material, thereby improving comprehension and learning.

== See also ==
- Helping behavior
- Helpfulness
- Social support
- Problem-solving
