= Social buffering =

Psychological phenomenon

In social psychology, social buffering is a phenomenon where social connections can alleviate negative consequences of stressful events.

Although there are other models and theories to describe how social support can help reduce individuals' stress responses, social buffering hypothesis is one of the dominant ones. According to this idea, social partners, who can be familiar others or conspecifics, act as buffers in the face of stressful events, specifically while the stress is happening. The model further describes that social support is especially beneficial when levels of stress are also high, but buffering effects are not as relevant when levels of stress are low.

Social buffering has been explored in humans and other social animals, and is important to questions about physical and mental health. Research has attempted to gain insight about the protective effects of social support in several domains, such as biological, developmental, neurological, and clinical settings. Social buffering is also relevant to other psychological processes, including fear, social bonding, and emotional reactivity.

== Background ==
=== Early history ===
Psychological research in the mid-twentieth century began to increasingly reveal the role of stressful life events on psychological well-being. This was also around the time that there was a focus on creating standardized approach to diagnosing mental illnesses, with the first Diagnostic and Statistical Manual of Mental Disorders (commonly referred to as the DSM) being published in 1952. With a honed focus on effective, universal ways to measure mental well-being, and the application of experimental psychology on social issues, a large literature on the effects of social support began to form. This occurred in an effort to fill in the gaps on the specific factors that mediate the relationship between life events and psychological consequences.

Specific focus on the attenuation of social support on the negative impacts of stressful events on physical and mental health began in the mid-1970s. This is around the time when the idea of social buffering began to take shape.

It is unclear where the phrase social buffering hypothesis was first mentioned, but one of the most credited and cited works on the topic was published by researchers Sheldon Cohen and Thomas A. Wills in 1985.

Social buffering has been an important feature in psychology since its early use, specifically relevant to social and health psychology. The framework has been applied to several other areas as well, and methods of measurement and definitions of relevant terminology continue to be refined and built upon.

=== Social support ===
Social buffering is a subset of social support, and not all occurrences of social support are social buffering. Social support encompasses both the expectation and actual act of being assisted, nurtured, attended to, or participation in a social network.

Research on social support makes the distinction between perceived support and received social support. Perceived social support refers to the amount of support people believe that they could potentially receive from their available support system, while received social support is the level of support that people have received. Some studies have shown that perceived social support may be better for mitigating the negative effects of stress on health and psychological well-being, suggesting there is a measurable difference between the types of social support, and proper definition of variables is important to research in the area.

Social support is robustly associated with positive health outcomes. Research has shown that people with larger social networks, higher-quality relationships, and greater access to social support resources have better mental and physical health. The effects of social support have been studied in many different domains of psychology, such as social, developmental, clinical, and health psychology, as well as neuroscience.

=== Competing model: direct effects hypothesis ===
The social buffering hypothesis is often compared to or evaluated with the direct effect hypothesis. This hypothesis differs from social buffering in that it holds that social support enhances physical and psychological well-being in general, regardless of the presence of stressors. This model says that social support is beneficial all the time, and that people with high social support have overall better health than those without it.

The two models tend to deal with different measures of social support. The direct effects hypothesis measures the level at which a person is integrated into a social network, while the social buffering hypothesis assesses how available the social resources are that help people respond to stressful events. The language around both hypotheses also tends to be different, with the direct effects hypothesis often looking at the enhancement of health and well-being as a result of the perception of support and integration in a network, whereas the buffering hypothesis is more concerned with protection (or prevention), especially in times of need.

Statistically, the direct effect hypothesis holds that there is no interaction between stress and social support, meaning the same beneficial effects will be observed notwithstanding of the level of stress. Conversely, according to the social buffering hypothesis, the magnitude of the beneficial effect from social support is larger when stress is present, which is reflected in a statistically significant observable interaction when the two effects are studied experimentally. This also means that knowledge of the degree of stress is required for the social buffering hypothesis, where this level may not be as relevant in the context of the direct effects hypothesis.

Despite these models providing somewhat separate explanations, research has found support for both hypotheses, and some work even suggests that both processes happen simultaneously. Researchers have suggested that work directed at critically comparing the two hypotheses may not actually benefit the field studying social support. Instead, it may be more beneficial to use either one as a model that aims to explain specific questions about how social support relates to mediators of health that can be behavioral, psychological, emotional, or biological.

== Biology ==
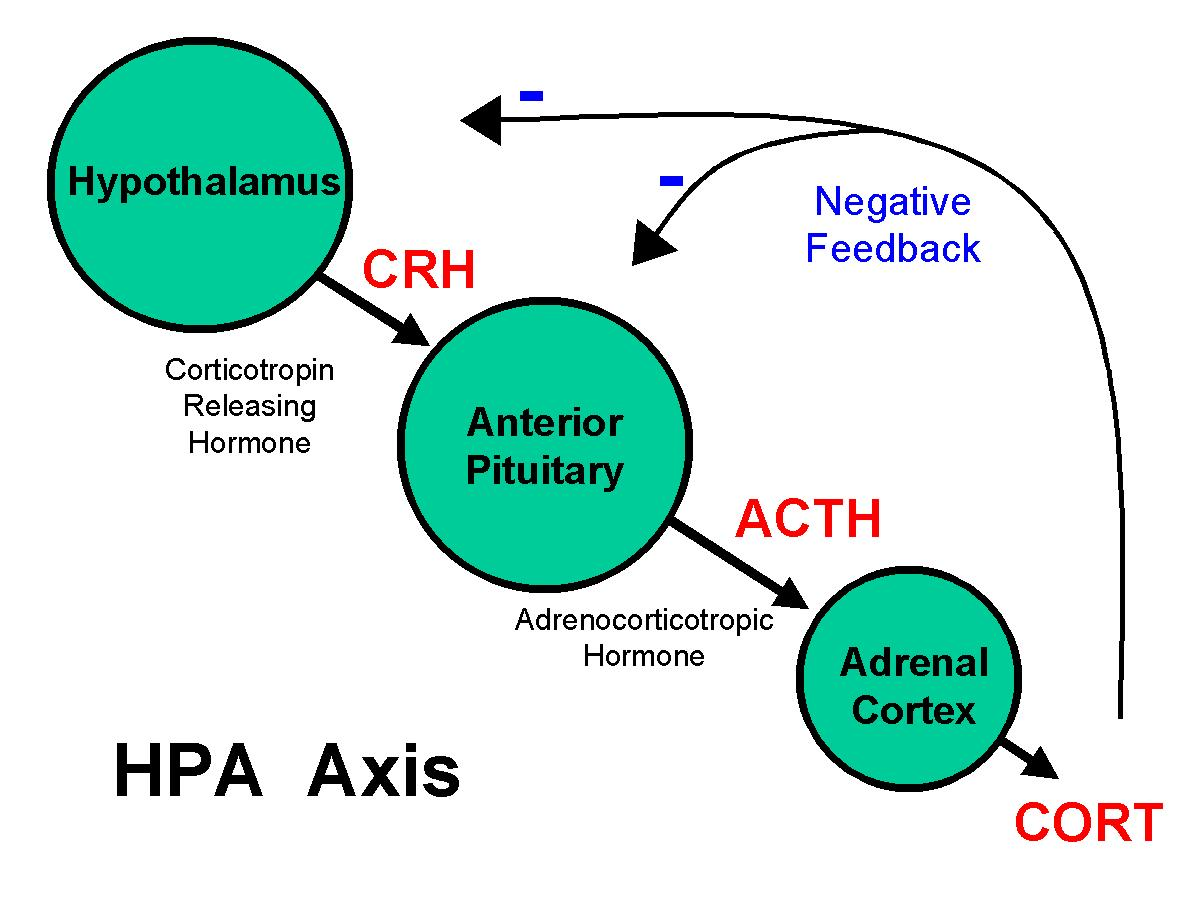
HPA axis and endocrine hormone mechanism

Research studies done on social buffering and health consequences consistently show that the HPA axis plays a central role in the link between the two.

The hypothalamic–pituitary–adrenal (HPA) axis is a crucial regulator of neuroendocrine responses in the body. The HPA axis is made up of a series of pathways and feedback loops that involve the hypothalamus, anterior pituitary gland, and adrenal gland. It modulates several physiological processes, including the autonomic nervous system, immune system reactions, metabolism, and several other processes that are active during short-term physiological responses to stress. The HPA axis also plays a major role in bodily homeostasis, which includes regulating the cardiovascular system, reproductive system, and central nervous system in addition to those previously mentioned.

Proper functioning of the HPA axis is very important for adaptation and development, and both over- and under-reactivity can lead to a series of consequences. It is important for humans to experience high levels of circulating stress hormones early in life so that they can learn to effectively respond to threat and adapt to their environments. However, too much stress in childhood can lead to long-term and often irreversible dysfunction of the HPA axis.

HPA axis activity goes up during aversive or arousing situations, which can be induced by physical or psychosocial events. The HPA axis is particularly sensitive to psychological stressors, including uncertainty, novelty, and the feeling of being out of control. In addition to being influenced by psychological stressors, one of the most powerful and widely studied moderators of HPA axis activity induced by stressful events is social support. This is why the HPA axis is often a focal point in physiological research examining social buffering effects.

The biological mechanisms of social buffering have been explored, and several components have been identified as relevant:

=== Endocrine ===
There are several hormones involved in HPA axis endocrine regulation. One is corticotrophin-releasing factor (CRF). CRF stimulates the release of adrenocorticotropic hormone (ACTH), which is the crucial physiological regulator of increased activity of the HPA axis. Another is vasopressin (AVP), and glucocorticoids are the final step in the process. Social buffering is observed when high levels of social support are correlated with lower levels of stress hormone and HPA axis activation.

=== Oxytocin ===
Oxytocin has been recognized as an important hormone involved in the mechanism of social buffering. Oxytocin is a molecule that is often called the "love hormone". It is released into the blood in response to physiological and psychological stress, and increased oxytocin release from the hypothalamus inhibits activation of the HPA axis. Oxytocin is involved in stress processes by inhibiting the release of corticosteroids, ACTH release from the pituitary gland, and release of CRF from the hypothalamus. The central nervous system also meditates the inhibitory effect of oxytocin on the HPA axis. Oxytocin is also involved in the behavioral side of social buffering. Oxytocin's role in bonding means that it is related to the process of social support, in addition to being released in response to a stressor.

=== Opioids ===
Endogenous opioids, or endorphins, also appear to play a major role in social buffering, via a reinforcing effect that is active in social attachment. Opioid release is also observed when animals recognize each other, which supports the idea that animals find social support in others of the same species. This is necessary to see social buffering effects in animals, and opioid release also helps explain the seeking of affiliation in animals as well. Opioid release as a result of social stimulation has also been found to reduce corticotrophin-releasing factor activity in the brain and body.

=== Neural circuitry ===
Research on the brain regions involved in social buffering is less extensive compared to the role of the HPA axis and cortisol.

However, the prefrontal cortex has been identified as a region involved in the social buffering and stress responses. Higher activity in the prefrontal cortex has been found to be correlated with higher degrees of cortisol responses to stress. A similar relationship has been observed in the anterior cingulate cortex. Both the prefrontal cortex and anterior cingulate cortex have been shown to be involved in emotional responses and reactivity to stressful situations, and activity in these areas is closely related with HPA activation. The presence of social support causes cortisol levels to go down as well as decreased activity in these regions.

Social buffering has also been observed in regions that are thought to be involved in responding to threats to safety, which include the ventromedial prefrontal cortex, anterior cingulate cortex, posterior insula, and posterior cingulate cortex.

== Clinical applications ==
Social support has been historically identified as very important for people's well-being, and it can be even more important for populations that are vulnerable to high stress and loneliness. Work on the social buffering hypothesis has been done on these populations, which include racial and ethnic minorities, sexual minorities, middle-aged and elderly, impoverished individuals, and other adversely affected demographic groups. This type of work aims to find specific applications of social buffering, often to provide frameworks for developing or assessing effectiveness of treatments or to build an understanding for prevention of the negative consequences of stressful life events.

A social buffering effect was observed in work done on suicidality, and findings indicate that focusing on buffering has the potential of being an effective area in developing interventions. The buffering effect has also been found to be strong in individuals with depression, meaning that social support can reduce symptoms of depression during times of stress. A relationship has also been drawn between social buffering and drug and alcohol use disorders, which lower likelihood of developing substance abuse disorders with higher social support.

Another issue that social buffering relates to is loneliness. The United States has a growing rate of loneliness, considered by some to be a "loneliness epidemic", and there is a documented rise in the number of people living alone in many cultures globally. Loneliness is strongly linked with many psychiatric disorders, including depression and anxiety, as well as several physical disorders, such as cardiovascular diseases and hypertension. Additionally, the rate of loneliness increases with age and has serious health consequences particularly in older populations. Research shows that high levels of social connectedness can help alleviate negative effects of loneliness that frequently accompany getting older. The robust connection between loneliness and poor mental and physical health is difficult to debate, and social buffering research can highlight the specific aspects of loneliness that are most damaging.

Social buffering is also relevant to the process of acculturation. Immigrants, guest workers, and international students may experience increased likelihood of isolation and psychological difficulties such as depressive symptoms. Research shows that those who have more interpersonal connections and participate in acculturation at higher degrees, benefit from the effects of social buffering. Increasing the size of one's social network has been shown to have salient buffering effects, particularly in older immigrants.

Social buffering works differently in different groups in society. There are gender, age, and cultural differences. Additionally, it can be difficult to study the effects of social support on stress in individuals who have impaired social functioning. These include individuals with social phobias and social anxiety disorder as well as autistic people.

== Development ==
Social buffering is recognized as an essential way through which the nature of experiences in childhood affect development and subsequent health.

During infancy, parents play a large role in regulating the negative consequences of childhood, especially regarding fear or pain responses. Attachment is also very relevant to studies on development and stress reduction. Attachment theory posits that the type of attachment relationship a child forms with their parents influences their ability to regulate emotional states whether or not the parents are immediately present. Stress buffering effects are often seen with securely attached children, indicating that the type and stability of relationships is crucial to how well a child recovers from stressful events.

Some research shows that parents are especially important for social buffering up until around puberty or late childhood, when primary caregivers tend to become less influential than peers in social settings. This does not take away from the role that parents play in social buffering as a whole, and instead reflects how they are replaced by friends who become a major source of social support with buffering. Furthermore, major stressors during adolescence and puberty tend to be peers and social standing, so the social buffering provided by friends during this time is heavily interwoven with social networks and relates to an idea called the friendship protection hypothesis. The friendship protection hypothesis reflects the idea of the social buffering hypothesis and explains how children with at least one supportive friend are less negatively affected by bullying and peer rejection.

When looking at social buffering and development, a common approach to measuring stress responses involves looking at the HPA axis. The HPA axis is referred to as one of the primary hormonal stress systems. Research looking at stress and social buffering in development consistently shows that parents play a role in shaping HPA axis function, which is evidenced in part by how early social deprivation may later result in long-term dysfunction of stress reactivity. Social buffering effects have also been observed when a child is exposed to a threatening event. The presence of a parent during such a time can lower or completely block the activation of the HPA axis.

Additional support for the social buffering hypothesis and social neuroscience involves fear conditioning. The amygdala has been recognized as an important part in the process of fear learning, and research has shown that children have reduced amygdala activity when around a parent. In addition to this, greater connectivity between the prefrontal cortex and amygdala was observed when a child viewed their mother compared to a stranger. The prefrontal cortex is involved in emotional processes, so communication between the two brain areas indicates that parents play a large role in emotional regulation and provide neurological support for social buffering.

Although the functioning of stress processes and fear learning are evolutionarily crucial, research on social buffering shows that social support can reduce the negative developmental consequences of too high stress and potentially aid with proper biological functioning.

== Animal research ==
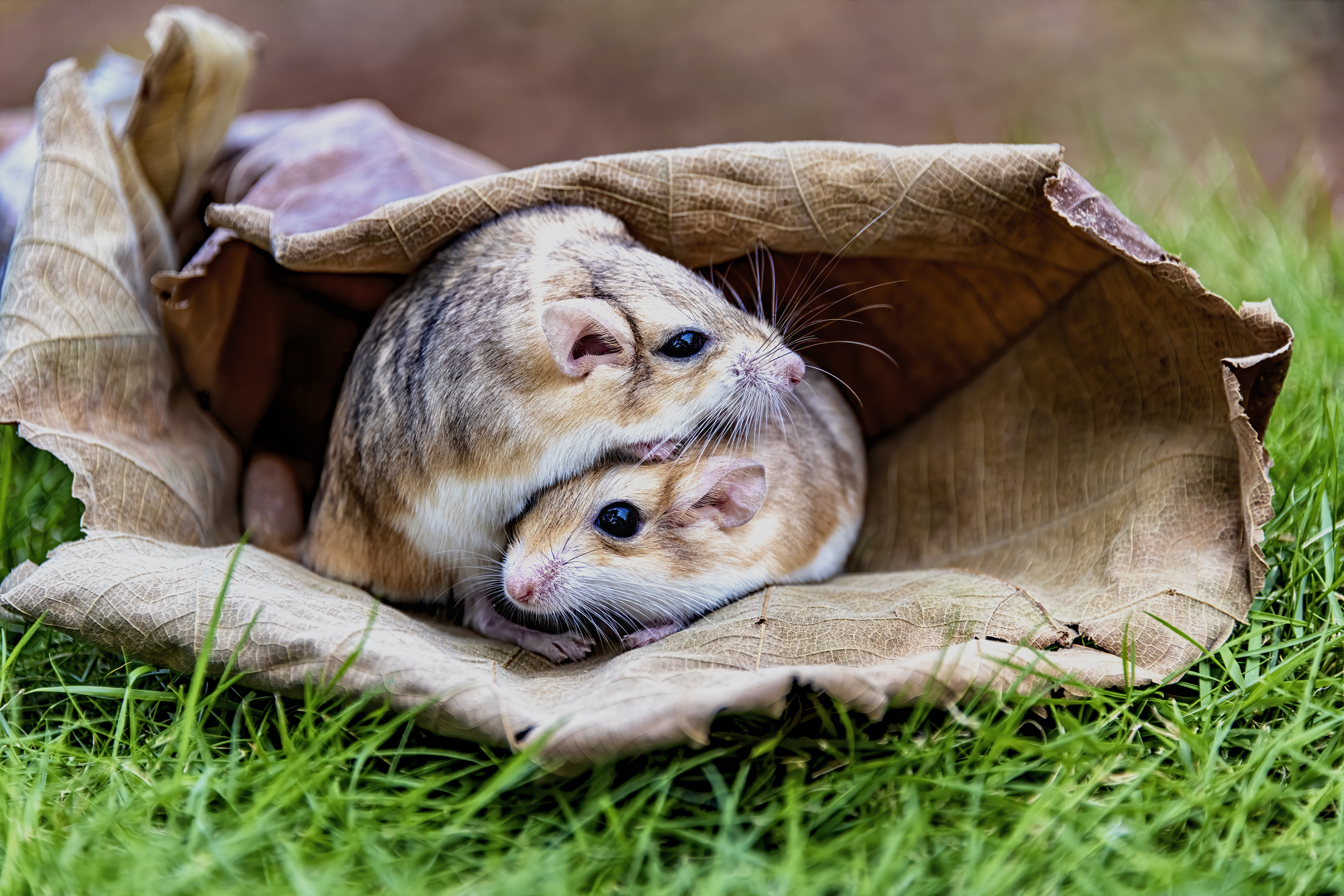
Social buffering has been observed in conspecific animals

Phenomena consistent with the social buffering hypothesis have been widely observed in non-human animals. The literature on animals uses the word conspecifics to refer to animals of the same species, and in each case it is clear that the effects are seen between like-animals and not due to the presence of other beings in general.

Social interaction and communication are very important for survival in many species of animals, aiding with cooperation and essential for protection from threats. Highly social animals, such as non-human primates, rodents, and birds, show positive physiological and psychological effects when they are together with animals of the same species. This was an idea that gained more attention in the early 2000s, while many of the experiments conducted in earlier research focused on the stress-inducing factors of social interaction.

Social buffering has been observed in a wide range of animals, including guinea pigs, horses, rhesus monkeys, and pigs. Studies have found support for social buffering both from a physiological, in the form of reduced HPA activity or lower cortisol levels, and behavioral perspective. Behavioral observations in rats, for example, include increased locomotor activity, indicating less fear, in a stress inducing open space in the presence of other rats, and an increase in the seeking of the proximity of other rats when they were exposed to stress.

Research on animals has also revealed several sensory cues for social buffering:

- Olfactory cues – Highly social animals use chemical communication to transmit certain information, such as emotional status in times of stress that alters both the physiological responses and behavior of animals. Animals may also use appeasing pheromones to calm others down and reduce fighting behavior. An example of this in humans is that maternal breast odor is both attractive to infants and has positive emotional effects.
- Vocal cues – Vocal communication can be used to indicate familiarity, emotions, and help with attachment formation. In marmosets, a species that use vocal communication, stress hormone levels decrease more when hearing a familiar voice compared to hearing an unfamiliar one.
- Visual cues – In certain animals, visual cues may be enough to evoke the effects of social buffering. These effects were shown in sheep, where seeing pictures of other sheep's faces reduced behavioral and physiological stress responses. Zebrafish have been observed to communicate about danger with visual cues, leading to social buffering from conspecifics in response to the threat of predators.
