= Social support =

Support systems for individuals

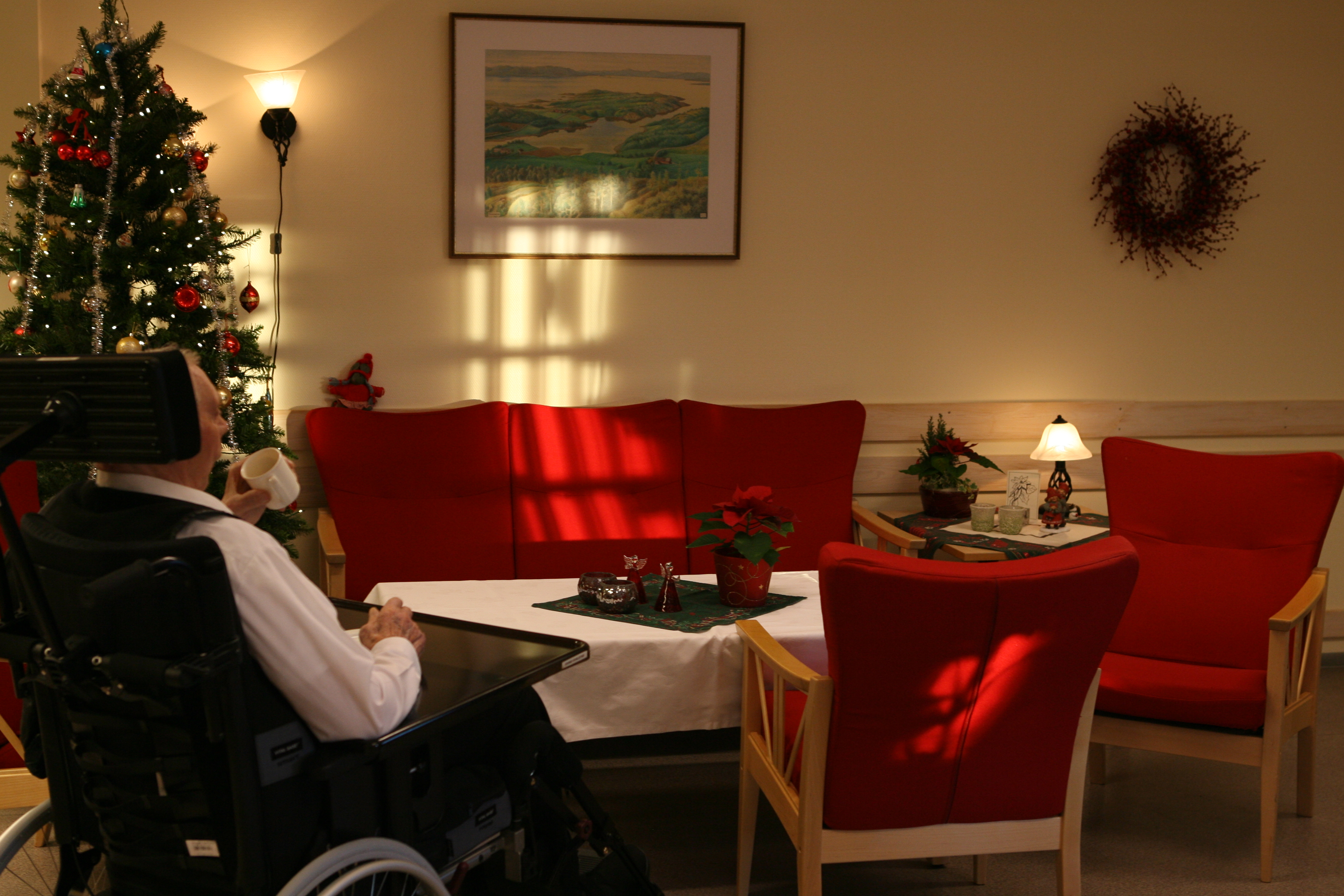
Old man at a nursing home in Norway

Social support is the perception and actuality that one is cared for, has assistance available from other people, and, most popularly, that one is part of a supportive social network. These supportive resources can be emotional (e.g., nurturance), informational (e.g., advice), or companionship (e.g., sense of belonging); tangible (e.g., financial assistance) or intangible (e.g., personal advice). Social support can be measured as the perception that one has assistance available, the actual received assistance, or the degree to which a person is integrated in a social network. Support can come from many sources, such as family, friends, pets, neighbors, coworkers, organizations, etc.

Social support is studied across a wide range of disciplines including psychology, communications, medicine, sociology, nursing, public health, education, rehabilitation, and social work. Social support has been linked to many benefits for both physical and mental health, but "social support" (e.g., gossiping about friends) is not always beneficial.

Social support theories and models were prevalent as intensive academic studies in the 1980s and 1990s, and are linked to the development of caregiver and payment models, and community delivery systems in the US and around the world. Two main models have been proposed to describe the link between social support and health: the buffering hypothesis and the direct effects hypothesis. Gender and cultural differences in social support have been found in fields such as education "which may not control for age, disability, income and social status, ethnic and racial, or other significant factors".

== Categories and definitions ==
=== Distinctions in measurement ===
Social support can be categorized and measured in several different ways.

There are four common functions of social support:

- Emotional support is the offering of empathy, concern, affection, love, trust, acceptance, intimacy, encouragement, or caring. It is the warmth and nurturance provided by sources of social support. Providing emotional support can let the individual know that he or she is valued.
- Tangible support is the provision of financial assistance, material goods, or services. Also called instrumental support, this form of social support encompasses the concrete, direct ways people assist others.
- Informational support is the provision of advice, guidance, suggestions, or useful information to someone. This type of information has the potential to help others problem-solve.
- Companionship support is the type of support that gives someone a sense of social belonging (and is also called belonging). This can be seen as the presence of companions to engage in shared social activities. Formerly, it was also referred to as "esteem support" or "appraisal support", but these have since developed into alternative forms of support under the name "appraisal support" along with normative and instrumental support.

Researchers also commonly make a distinction between perceived and received support. Perceived support refers to a recipient's subjective judgment that providers will offer (or have offered) effective help during times of need. Received support (also called enacted support) refers to specific supportive actions (e.g., advice or reassurance) offered by providers during times of need.

One of the most widely used instruments for assessing perceived social support is the Multidimensional Scale of Perceived Social Support (MSPSS), developed by Gregory Zimet, Nancy Dahlem and colleagues in 1988. The MSPSS is a 12-item self-report measure that evaluates perceived adequacy of support from three sources, family, friends, and a significant other, organizing support by its source rather than by function. The scale has demonstrated strong factorial validity and reliability across diverse populations, and research using the MSPSS has consistently linked higher perceived social support to lower levels of depression and anxiety.

Furthermore, social support can be measured in terms of structural support or functional support. Structural support (also called social integration) refers to the extent to which a recipient is connected within a social network, like the number of social ties or how integrated a person is within his or her social network. Family relationships, friends, and membership in clubs and organizations contribute to social integration. Functional support looks at the specific functions that members in this social network can provide, such as the emotional, instrumental, informational, and companionship support listed above. Data suggests that emotional support may play a more significant role in protecting individuals from the deleterious effects of stress than structural means of support, such as social involvement or activity.

These different types of social support have different patterns of correlations with health, personality, and personal relationships. For example, perceived support is consistently linked to better mental health whereas received support and social integration are not. In fact, research indicates that perceived social support that is untapped can be more effective and beneficial than utilized social support. Some have suggested that invisible support, a form of support where the person has support without his or her awareness, may be the most beneficial. This view has been complicated, however, by more recent research suggesting the effects of invisible social support – as with visible support – are moderated by provider, recipient, and contextual factors such as recipients' perceptions of providers' responsiveness to their needs, or the quality of the relationship between the support provider and recipient.

=== Sources ===
Social support can come from a variety of sources, including (but not limited to): family, friends, romantic partners, pets, community ties, and coworkers. Sources of support can be natural (e.g., family and friends) or more formal (e.g., mental health specialists or community organizations). The source of the social support is an important determinant of its effectiveness as a coping strategy. Support from a romantic partner is associated with health benefits, particularly for men. However, one study has found that although support from spouses buffered the negative effects of work stress, it did not buffer the relationship between marital and parental stresses, because the spouses were implicated in these situations. However, work-family specific support worked more to alleviate work-family stress that feeds into marital and parental stress. Employee humor is negatively associated with burnout, and positively with health and stress coping effectiveness. Additionally, social support from friends did provide a buffer in response to marital stress, because they were less implicated in the marital dynamic.

Early familial social support has been shown to be important in children's abilities to develop social competencies, and supportive parental relationships have also had benefits for college-aged students. Teacher and school personnel support have been shown to be stronger than other relationships of support. This is hypothesized to be a result of family and friend social relationships to be subject to conflicts whereas school relationships are more stable.

=== Online social support ===
Social support is also available among social media sites. As technology advances, the availability for online support increases. Social support can be offered through social media websites such as blogs, Facebook groups, health forums, and online support groups.

Early theories and research into Internet use tended to suggest negative implications for offline social networks (e.g., fears that Internet use would undermine desire for face-to-face interaction) and users' well-being. However, additional work showed null or even positive effects, contributing to a more nuanced understanding of online social processes. Emerging data increasingly suggest that, as with offline support, the effects of online social support are shaped by support provider, recipient, and contextual factors. For example, the interpersonal-connection-behaviors framework reconciles conflicts in the research literature by suggesting that social network site use is likely to contribute to well-being when users engage in ways that foster meaningful interpersonal connection. Conversely, use may harm well-being when users engage in passive consumption of social media.

Online support can be similar to face-to-face social support, but may also offer convenience, anonymity, and non-judgmental interactions. Online sources such as social media may be less redundant sources of social support for users with relatively little in-person support compared to persons with high in-person support. Online sources may be especially important as potential social support resources for individuals with limited offline support, and may be related to physical and psychological well-being. However, socially isolated individuals may also be more drawn to computer-mediated vs. in-person forms of interaction, which may contribute to bidirectional associations between online social activity and isolation or depression.

Support sought through social media can also provide users with emotional comfort that relates them to others while creating awareness about particular health issues. Research conducted by Winzelberg et al. evaluated an online support group for women with breast cancer finding participants were able to form fulfilling supportive relationships in an asynchronous format and this form of support proved to be effective in reducing participants' scores on depression, perceived stress, cancer-related trauma measures, and even IVF treatments. This type of online communication can increase the ability to cope with stress. Social support through social media is potentially available to anyone with Internet access and allows users to create relationships and receive encouragement for a variety of issues, including rare conditions or circumstances.

Coulson claims online support groups provide a unique opportunity for health professionals to learn about the experiences and views of individuals. This type of social support can also benefit users by providing them with a variety of information. Seeking informational social support allows users to access suggestions, advice, and information regarding health concerns or recovery. Many need social support, and its availability on social media may broaden access to a wider range of people in need. Both experimental and correlational research have indicated that increased social network site use can lead to greater perceived social support and increased social capital, both of which predict enhanced well-being.

An increasing number of interventions aim to create or enhance social support in online communities. While preliminary data often suggest such programs may be well received by users and may yield benefits, additional research is needed to more clearly establish the effectiveness of many such interventions.

Until the late 2010s, research examining online social support tended to use ad hoc instruments or measures that were adapted from offline research, resulting in the possibility that measures were not well-suited for measuring online support, or had weak or unknown psychometric properties. Instruments specifically developed to measure social support in online contexts include the Online Social Support Scale (which has sub scales for esteem/emotional support, social companionship, informational support, and instrumental support) and the Online Social Experiences Measure (which simultaneously assesses positive and negative aspects of online social activity and has predictive validity regarding cardiovascular implications of online social support).

== Links to mental and physical health ==
=== Benefits ===
==== Mental health ====
Social support profile is associated with increased psychological well-being in the workplace and in response to important life events. There has been an ample amount of evidence showing that social support aids in lowering problems related to one's mental health. As reported by Cutrona, Russell, and Rose, in the elderly population that was in their studies, their results showed that elderly individuals who had relationships where their self-esteem was elevated were less likely to have a decline in their health. In stressful times, social support helps people reduce psychological distress (e.g., anxiety or depression). Social support can simultaneously function as a problem-focused (e.g. receiving tangible information that helps resolve an issue) and emotion-focused coping strategy (e.g. used to regulate emotional responses that arise from the stressful event) Social support has been found to promote psychological adjustment in conditions with chronic high stress like HIV, rheumatoid arthritis, cancer, stroke, and coronary artery disease. Whereas a lack of social support has been associated with a risk for an individual's mental health. This study also shows that the social support acts as a buffer to protect individuals from different aspects in regards to their mental and physical health, such as helping against certain life stressors. Additionally, social support has been associated with various acute and chronic pain variables (for more information, see Chronic pain).

People with low social support report more sub-clinical symptoms of depression and anxiety than people with high social support. In addition, people with low social support have higher rates of major mental disorder than those with high support. These include post-traumatic stress disorder (PTSD), panic disorder, social phobia, major depressive disorder, dysthymic disorder, and eating disorders. Among people with schizophrenia, those with low social support have more symptoms of the disorder. In addition, people with low support have more suicidal ideation, and more alcohol and (illicit and prescription) drug problems. Similar results have been found among children. Religious coping has especially been shown to correlate positively with positive psychological adjustment to stressors with enhancement of faith-based social support hypothesized as the likely mechanism of effect. However, more recent research reveals the role of religiosity/spirituality in enhancing social support may be overstated and in fact disappears when the personality traits of "agreeableness" and "conscientiousness" are also included as predictors.

In a 2013 study, Akey et al. did a qualitative study of 34 men and women diagnosed with an eating disorder and used the Health Belief Model (HBM) to explain the reasons for which they forgo seeking social support. Many people with eating disorders have a low perceived susceptibility, which can be explained as a sense of denial about their illness. Their perceived severity of the illness is affected by those to whom they compare themselves to, often resulting in people believing their illness is not severe enough to seek support. Due to poor past experiences or educated speculation, the perception of benefits for seeking social support is relatively low. The number of perceived barriers towards seeking social support often prevents people with eating disorders from getting the support they need to better cope with their illness. Such barriers include fear of social stigma, financial resources, and availability and quality of support. Self-efficacy may also explain why people with eating disorders do not seek social support, because they may not know how to properly express their need for help. This research has helped to create a better understanding of why individuals with eating disorders do not seek social support, and may lead to increased efforts to make such support more available. Eating disorders are classified as mental illnesses but can also have physical health repercussions. Creating a strong social support system for those affected by eating disorders may help such individuals to have a higher quality of both mental and physical health.

Various studies have been performed examining the effects of social support on psychological distress. Interest in the implications of social support were triggered by a series of articles published in the mid-1970s, each reviewing literature examining the association between psychiatric disorders and factors such as change in marital status, geographic mobility, and social disintegration. Researchers realized that the theme present in each of these situations is the absence of adequate social support and the disruption of social networks. This observed relationship sparked numerous studies concerning the effects of social support on mental health.

One particular study documented the effects of social support as a coping strategy on psychological distress in response to stressful work and life events among police officers. Talking things over among coworkers was the most frequent form of coping utilized while on duty, whereas most police officers kept issues to themselves while off duty. The study found that the social support between co-workers significantly buffered the relationship between work-related events and distress.

Other studies have examined the social support systems of single mothers. One study by D'Ercole demonstrated that the effects of social support vary in both form and function and will have drastically different effects depending upon the individual. The study found that supportive relationships with friends and co-workers, rather than task-related support from family, was positively related to the mother's psychological well-being. D'Ercole hypothesizes that friends of a single parent offer a chance to socialize, match experiences, and be part of a network of peers. These types of exchanges may be more spontaneous and less obligatory than those between relatives. Additionally, co-workers can provide a community away from domestic life, relief from family demands, a source of recognition, and feelings of competence. D'Ercole also found an interesting statistical interaction whereby social support from co-workers decreased the experience of stress only in lower income individuals. The author hypothesizes that single women who earn more money are more likely to hold more demanding jobs which require more formal and less dependent relationships. Additionally, those women who earn higher incomes are more likely to be in positions of power, where relationships are more competitive than supportive.

Many studies have been dedicated specifically to understanding the effects of social support in individuals with (PTSD). In a study by Haden et al., when victims of severe trauma perceived high levels of social support and engaged in interpersonal coping styles, they were less likely to develop severe PTSD when compared to those who perceived lower levels of social support. These results suggest that high levels of social support alleviate the strong positive association between level of injury and severity of PTSD, and thus serves as a powerful protective factor. In general, data shows that the support of family and friends has a positive influence on an individual's ability to cope with trauma. In fact, a meta-analysis by Brewin et al. found that social support was the strongest predictor, accounting for 40%, of variance in PTSD severity. However, perceived social support may be directly affected by the severity of the trauma. In some cases, support decreases with increases in trauma severity.

College students have also been the target of various studies on the effects of social support on coping. Reports between 1990 and 2003 showed college stresses were increasing in severity. Studies have also shown that college students' perceptions of social support have shifted from viewing support as stable to viewing them as variable and fluctuating. In the face of such mounting stress, students naturally seek support from family and friends in order to alleviate psychological distress. A study by Chao found a significant two-way correlation between perceived stress and social support, as well as a significant three-way correlation between perceived stress, social support, and dysfunctional coping. The results indicated that high levels of dysfunctional coping deteriorated the association between stress and well-being at both high and low levels of social support, suggesting that dysfunctional coping can deteriorate the positive buffering action of social support on well-being. Students who reported social support were found more likely to engage in less healthy activities, including sedentary behavior, drug and alcohol use, and too much or too little sleep. Lack of social support in college students is also strongly related to life dissatisfaction and suicidal behavior.

==== Physical health ====
Social support has a clearly demonstrated link to physical health outcomes in individuals, with numerous ties to physical health including mortality. People with low social support are at a much higher risk of death from a variety of diseases (e.g., cancer or cardiovascular disease). Numerous studies have shown that people with higher social support have an increased likelihood for survival.

Individuals with lower levels of social support have: more cardiovascular disease, more inflammation and less effective immune system functioning, more complications during pregnancy, and more functional disability and pain associated with rheumatoid arthritis, among many other findings. Conversely, higher rates of social support have been associated with numerous positive outcomes, including faster recovery from coronary artery surgery, less susceptibility to herpes attacks, a lowered likelihood to show age-related cognitive decline, and better diabetes control. People with higher social support are also less likely to develop colds and are able to recover faster if they are ill from a cold. There is sufficient evidence linking cardiovascular, neuroendocrine, and immune system function with higher levels of social support. Social support predicts less atherosclerosis and is associated with the slower progression of an already diagnosed cardiovascular disease. There is also a clearly demonstrated link between social support and better immune function, especially in older adults. While links have been shown between neuroendocrine functionality and social support, further understanding is required before specific significant claims can be made. Social support is also hypothesized to be beneficial in the recovery from less severe cancers. Research focuses on breast cancers, but in more serious cancers factors such as severity and spread are difficult to measure in the context of impacts of social support. The field of physical health often struggles with the combination of variables set by external factors that are difficult to control, such as the entangled impact of life events on social support and the buffering impact these events have. There are serious ethical concerns involved with controlling too many factors of social support in individuals, leading to an interesting crossroads in the research.

=== Costs ===
Social support is integrated into service delivery schemes and sometimes are a primary service provided by governmental contracted entities (e.g., companionship, peer services, family caregivers). Community services known by the nomenclature community support, and workers by a similar title, Direct Support Professional, have a base in social and community support "ideology". All supportive services from supported employment to supported housing, family support, educational support, and supported living are based upon the relationship between "informal and formal" supports, and "paid and unpaid caregivers". Inclusion studies, based upon affiliation and friendship, or the conversely, have a similar theoretical basis as do "person-centered support" strategies.

Social support theories are often found in "real life" in cultural, music and arts communities, and as might be expected within religious communities. Social support is integral in theories of aging, and the "social care systems" have often been challenged (e.g., creativity throughout the lifespan, extra retirement hours). Ed Skarnulis' (state director) adage, "Support, don't supplant the family" applies to other forms of social support networks.

Although there are many benefits to social support, it is not always beneficial. It has been proposed that in order for social support to be beneficial, the social support desired by the individual has to match the support given to him or her; this is known as the matching hypothesis. Psychological stress may increase if a different type of support is provided than what the recipient wishes to receive (e.g., informational is given when emotional support is sought). Additionally, elevated levels of perceived stress can impact the effect of social support on health-related outcomes.

Other costs have been associated with social support. For example, received support has not been linked consistently to either physical or mental health; perhaps surprisingly, received support has sometimes been linked to worse mental health. Additionally, if social support is overly intrusive, it can increase stress. It is important when discussing social support to always consider the possibility that the social support system is actually an antagonistic influence on an individual.

=== Two dominant models ===
There are two dominant hypotheses addressing the link between social support and health: the buffering hypothesis and the direct effects hypothesis. The main difference between these two hypotheses is that the direct effects hypothesis predicts that social support is beneficial all the time, while the buffering hypothesis predicts that social support is mostly beneficial during stressful times. Evidence has been found for both hypotheses.

In the buffering hypothesis, social support protects (or "buffers") people from the bad effects of stressful life events (e.g., death of a spouse, job loss). Evidence for stress buffering is found when the correlation between stressful events and poor health is weaker for people with high social support than for people with low social support. The weak correlation between stress and health for people with high social support is often interpreted to mean that social support has protected people from stress. Stress buffering is more likely to be observed for perceived support than for social integration or received support. The theoretical concept or construct of resiliency is associated with coping theories.

In the direct effects (also called main effects) hypothesis, people with high social support are in better health than people with low social support, regardless of stress. In addition to showing buffering effects, perceived support also shows consistent direct effects for mental health outcomes. Both perceived support and social integration show main effects for physical health outcomes. However, received (enacted) support rarely shows main effects.

=== Theories to explain the links ===
Several theories have been proposed to explain social support's link to health. Stress and coping social support theory dominates social support research and is designed to explain the buffering hypothesis described above. According to this theory, social support protects people from the bad health effects of stressful events (i.e., stress buffering) by influencing how people think about and cope with the events. An example in 2018 are the effects of school shootings on the well-being and future of children and children's health. According to stress and coping theory, events are stressful insofar as people have negative thoughts about the event (appraisal) and cope ineffectively. Coping consists of deliberate, conscious actions such as problem solving or relaxation. As applied to social support, stress and coping theory suggests that social support promotes adaptive appraisal and coping. Evidence for stress and coping social support theory is found in studies that observe stress buffering effects for perceived social support. One problem with this theory is that, as described previously, stress buffering is not seen for social integration, and that received support is typically not linked to better health outcomes.

Relational regulation theory (RRT) is another theory, which is designed to explain main effects (the direct effects hypothesis) between perceived support and mental health. As mentioned previously, perceived support has been found to have both buffering and direct effects on mental health. RRT was proposed in order to explain perceived support's main effects on mental health which cannot be explained by the stress and coping theory. RRT hypothesizes that the link between perceived support and mental health comes from people regulating their emotions through ordinary conversations and shared activities rather than through conversations on how to cope with stress. This regulation is relational in that the support providers, conversation topics and activities that help regulate emotion are primarily a matter of personal taste. This is supported by previous work showing that the largest part of perceived support is relational in nature.

Life-span theory is another theory to explain the links of social support and health, which emphasizes the differences between perceived and received support. According to this theory, social support develops throughout the life span, but especially in childhood attachment with parents. Social support develops along with adaptive personality traits such as low hostility, low neuroticism, high optimism, as well as social and coping skills. Together, support and other aspects of personality ("psychological theories") influence health largely by promoting health practices (e.g., exercise and weight management) and by preventing health-related stressors (e.g., job loss, divorce). Evidence for life-span theory includes that a portion of perceived support is trait-like, and that perceived support is linked to adaptive personality characteristics and attachment experiences. Lifespan theories are popular from their origins in Schools of Human Ecology at the universities, aligned with family theories, and researched through federal centers over decades (e.g., University of Kansas, Beach Center for Families; Cornell University, School of Human Ecology).

Of the Big Five personality traits, agreeableness is associated with people receiving the most social support and having the least-strained relationships at work and home. Receiving support from a supervisor in the workplace is associated with alleviating tensions both at work and at home, as are inter-dependency and idiocentrism of an employee.

=== Biological pathways ===
Many studies have tried to identify biopsychosocial pathways for the link between social support and health. Social support has been found to positively impact the immune, neuroendocrine, and cardiovascular systems. Although these systems are listed separately here, evidence has shown that these systems can interact and affect each other.

- Immune system: Social support is generally associated with better immune function. For example, being more socially integrated is correlated with lower levels of inflammation (as measured by C-reactive protein, a marker of inflammation), and people with more social support have a lower susceptibility to the common cold.
- Neuroendocrine system: Social support has been linked to lower cortisol ("stress hormone") levels in response to stress. Neuroimaging work has found that social support decreases activation of regions in the brain associated with social distress, and that this diminished activity was also related to lowered cortisol levels.
- Cardiovascular system: Social support has been found to lower cardiovascular reactivity to stressors. It has been found to lower blood pressure and heart rates, which are known to benefit the cardiovascular system.

Though many benefits have been found, not all research indicates positive effects of social support on these systems. For example, sometimes the presence of a support figure can lead to increased neuroendocrine and physiological activity.

=== Support groups ===
Social support groups can be a source of informational support, by providing valuable educational information, and emotional support, including encouragement from people experiencing similar circumstances. Studies have generally found beneficial effects for social support group interventions for various conditions, including Internet support groups. These groups may be termed "self help" groups in nation-states, may be offered by non-profit organizations, and in 2018, may be paid for as part of governmental reimbursement schemes. According to Drebing, previous studies have shown that those going to support groups later show enhanced social support... in regard to groups such as Alcoholics Anonymous (AA) and Narcotics Anonymous (NA), were shown to have a positive correlation with participation in their subsequent groups and abstaining from their addiction. Because correlation does not equal causation, going to those meeting does not cause one to abstain from divulging back into old habits rather that this been shown to be helpful in establishing sobriety. While many support groups are held where the discussions can be face to face there has been evidence that shows online support offers the same amount of benefits. Coulson found that through discussion forums several benefits can be added such as being able to cope with things and having an overall sense of well-being.

=== Providing support ===
There are both costs and benefits to providing support to others. Providing long-term care or support for someone else is a chronic stressor that has been associated with anxiety, depression, alterations in the immune system, and increased mortality. Thus, family caregivers and "university personnel" alike have advocated for both respite or relief, and higher payments related to ongoing, long-term care giving. However, providing support has also been associated with health benefits. In fact, providing instrumental support to friends, relatives, and neighbors, or emotional support to spouses has been linked to a significant decrease in the risk for mortality. Researchers found that within couples where one has been diagnosed with breast cancer, not only does the spouse with the illness benefit from the provision and receipt of support but so does the spouse with no illness. It was found that the relationship well being was the area that benefited for the spouses of those with breast cancer Also, a recent neuroimaging study found that giving support to a significant other during a distressful experience increased activation in reward areas of the brain.

=== Social defense system ===
In 1959 Isabel Menzies Lyth identified that threat to a person's identity in a group where they share similar characteristics develops a defense system inside the group which stems from emotions experienced by members of the group, which are difficult to articulate, cope with and finds solutions to. Together with an external pressure on efficiency, a collusive and injunctive system develops that is resistant to change, supports their activities and prohibit others from performing their major tasks.

== Gender and culture ==
=== Gender differences ===
Gender differences have been found in social support research. Women provide more social support to others and are more engaged in their social networks. Evidence has also supported the notion that women may be better providers of social support. In addition to being more involved in the giving of support, women are also more likely to seek out social support to deal with stress, especially from their spouses. However, one study indicates that there are no differences in the extent to which men and women seek appraisal, informational, and instrumental types of support. Rather, the big difference lies in seeking emotional support. Additionally, social support may be more beneficial to women. Shelley Taylor and her colleagues have suggested that these gender differences in social support may stem from the biological difference between men and women in how they respond to stress (i.e., flight or fight versus tend and befriend). Married men are less likely to be depressed compared to non-married men after the presence of a particular stressor because men are able to delegate their emotional burdens to their partner, and women have been shown to be influenced and act more in reaction to social context compared to men. It has been found that men's behaviors are overall more asocial, with less regard to the impact their coping may have upon others, and women more prosocial with importance stressed on how their coping affects people around them. This may explain why women are more likely to experience negative psychological problems such as depression and anxiety based on how women receive and process stressors. In general, women are likely to find situations more stressful than males are. When the perceived stress level is the same, men and women have much fewer differences in how they seek and use social support.

=== Cultural differences ===
Although social support is thought to be a universal resource, cultural differences exist in social support. In many Asian cultures, the person is seen as more of a collective unit of society, whereas Western cultures are more individualistic and conceptualize social support as a transaction in which one person seeks help from another. In more interdependent Eastern cultures, people are less inclined to enlist the help of others. For example, European Americans have been found to call upon their social relationships for social support more often than Asian Americans or Asians during stressful occasions, and Asian Americans expect social support to be less helpful than European Americans. These differences in social support may be rooted in different cultural ideas about social groups. These differences are stronger in emotional support than instrumental support. Additionally, ethnic differences in social support from family and friends have been found.

Cultural differences in coping strategies other than social support also exist. One study shows that Koreans are more likely to report substance abuse than European Americans are. Further, European Americans are more likely to exercise in order to cope than Koreans. Some cultural explanations are that Asians are less likely to seek it from fear of disrupting the harmony of their relationships and that they are more inclined to settle their problems independently and avoid criticism. However, these differences are not found among Asian Americans relative to their Europeans American counterparts.

Different cultures have different ways of social support. In African American households support is limited. Many black mothers raise their children without a male figure. Women struggle with job opportunities due to job biases and racial discrimination. Many Black women face this harsh reality causing them to go through poverty. When there is poverty within home, the main focus is to make sure the bills are paid. Sometimes causing children to play adult roles at a very young age. Women trying to balance the mom and dad role, takes away from the moral support certain kids need.

== See also ==
- Family support
- Interpersonal emotion regulation
- Invisible support
- Narcissistic supply
- Respect
- Peer support
- Prosocial behavior
- Social capital
- Social connection
- Social undermining
- Stress (psychological)
- Supported employment
- Supported housing
- Welfare
- Social Support Questionnaire
- Help-seeking
