= Coping =

Strategies used to reduce unpleasant emotions

Coping refers to the application of coping mechanisms, conscious and unconscious cognitions that people use to manage unpleasant emotions, stress, and anxiety. Coping mechanisms can be adaptive, meaning that they successfully improve the well-being of the person applying them, or maladaptive, meaning they may manage a specific unpleasant emotion, but at the expense of other aspects of one's mental and/or physical health.

== Theories of coping ==
Hundreds of coping strategies have been proposed to explain how people manage stress. However, no universal classification system has been agreed upon. Researchers have grouped coping responses through rational, empirical (factor-analytic), or hybrid approaches.

Early work by Folkman and Lazarus categorized coping into four main types:

1. Problem-focused coping
2. Emotion-focused coping
3. Support-seeking coping
4. Meaning-making coping

Weiten and Lloyd identified four related types: appraisal-focused (adaptive cognitive), problem-focused (adaptive behavioral), emotion-focused, and occupation-focused coping.

Billings and Moos later added avoidance coping as a subset of emotion-focused strategies. However, some scholars have questioned the psychometric validity of such strict categorizations, noting that coping strategies often overlap and that individuals may employ multiple strategies simultaneously.

People typically use a combination of coping functions that change over time. While all strategies can be useful, individuals who rely more on problem-focused coping tend to adjust better overall. This may be because problem-focused coping provides a greater sense of control, whereas emotion-focused coping sometimes reduces perceived control.

Lazarus noted a link between his concept of "defensive re-appraisal" and Freud's notion of "ego defenses", illustrating that coping strategies can overlap with psychological defense mechanisms.

=== Appraisal-focused coping strategies ===
Appraisal-focused (or adaptive cognitive) coping involves changing the way a person thinks about or conceptualizes a stressful situation. Individuals may deny or cognitively distance themselves from the situation in an effort to reframe their perspective to a less emotionally difficult outlook.

=== Adaptive behavioral coping strategies ===
Adaptive behavioral coping strategies are coping mechanisms that involve direct behavioural action.

Coping is often reactive, meaning it occurs in response to a stressor. This differs from proactive coping, which aims to prepare for or prevent future stressors. Defense mechanisms, which operate unconsciously, are typically considered separate from coping.

The effectiveness of coping depends on the stressor type, the individual's traits, and the surrounding environment. People using problem-focused strategies attempt to address the source of stress directly, often by gathering information or developing new skills. Folkman and Lazarus identified three main problem-focused approaches: taking control, information seeking, and evaluating pros and cons.

However, problem-focused coping may backfire when stressors are uncontrollable, such as chronic illness or loss.

=== Emotion-focused coping strategies ===
Emotion-focused strategies include releasing pent-up emotions, distracting oneself, managing hostile feelings, meditating, mindfulness practices, using systematic relaxation procedures, and situational exposure.

Emotion-focused coping "is oriented toward managing the emotions that accompany the perception of stress". The five emotion-focused coping strategies identified by Folkman and Lazarus are disclaiming, escape-avoidance, accepting responsibility or blame, exercising self-control, and positive reappraisal.

Emotion-focused coping is a mechanism to alleviate distress by minimizing, reducing, or preventing the emotional components of a stressor. Emotion-focused coping strategies may also include media-based practices such as comfort television, where individuals engage with familiar and predictable content to regulate mood and alleviate stress. This mechanism can be applied through a variety of ways, such as seeking social support, reappraising the stressor in a positive light, reccepting responsibility, using avoidance, exercising self-control, and distancing from others.

The focus of this coping mechanism is to change the meaning of the stressor or transfer mental attention away from it. For example, re-appraisal tries to find a more positive meaning of the cause of the stress to reduce the emotional component of the stressor. Avoidance of the emotional distress will distract from the negative feelings associated with the stressor.

Emotion-focused coping is well suited for stressors that seem uncontrollable (e.g., a terminal illness diagnosis, or the loss of a loved one). Some mechanisms of emotion-focused coping, such as distancing or avoidance, can have alleviating outcomes for a short period of time; however they can be detrimental when used over an extended period.

Positive emotion-focused mechanisms, such as seeking social support and positive re-appraisal, are associated with beneficial outcomes. Emotional approach coping is one form of emotion-focused coping in which emotional expression and processing are used to adaptively manage a response to a stressor. Other examples include relaxation training through deep breathing, meditation, yoga, music and art therapy, and aromatherapy.

=== Health theory of coping ===
The Health Theory of Coping addresses limitations of earlier models by classifying coping strategies as healthy or unhealthy based on likely outcomes.

Healthy categories include self-soothing, relaxation/distraction, and social and professional support. Unhealthy categories include negative self-talk, harmful activities (e.g., overeating, aggression, substance use, self-harm), social withdrawal, and suicidality.

=== Reactive and proactive coping ===
Most coping is reactive in that the coping response follows stressors. Anticipating and reacting to a future stressor is known as proactive coping or future-oriented coping. Anticipation is when one reduces the stress of some difficult challenge by anticipating what it will be like and preparing for how one is going to cope with it.

=== Social coping ===
Social coping recognizes that individuals are embedded within a social environment, which can be stressful, but also is the source of coping resources, such as seeking social support from others. (see help-seeking)

=== Humor ===
Humor used as a positive coping method may have useful benefits to emotional and mental health well-being. However, maladaptive humor styles such as self-defeating humor can also have negative effects on psychological adjustment and might exacerbate negative effects of other stressors. By having a humorous outlook on life, stressful experiences can be and are often minimized. This coping method corresponds with positive emotional states and is known to be an indicator of mental health. Physiological processes are also influenced by the exercise of humor. For example, laughing may reduce muscle tension, increase the flow of oxygen to the blood, exercise the cardiovascular region, and produce endorphins in the body.

Using humor in coping while processing feelings can vary depending on life circumstances and individual humor styles. In regard to grief and loss in life occurrences, it has been found that genuine laughs/smiles when speaking about the loss predicted later adjustment and evoked more positive responses from other people. A person might also find comedic relief with others around irrational possible outcomes for the deceased's funeral service. It is also possible that humor would be used by people to feel a sense of control over a more powerless situation and used as a way to temporarily escape a feeling of helplessness. Exercised humor can be a sign of positive adjustment as well as drawing support and interaction from others around the loss.

=== Negative techniques (maladaptive coping or non-coping) ===
Whereas adaptive coping strategies improve functioning, a maladaptive coping technique (also termed non-coping) will just reduce symptoms while maintaining or strengthening the stressor. Maladaptive techniques are only effective as a short-term rather than long-term coping process.

Examples of maladaptive behavior strategies include anxious avoidance, dissociation, escape (including self-medication), use of maladaptive humor styles such as self-defeating humor, procrastination, rationalization, safety behaviors, and sensitization. These coping strategies interfere with the person's ability to unlearn, or break apart, the paired association between the situation and the associated anxiety symptoms. These are maladaptive strategies as they serve to maintain the disorder.

- Anxious avoidance is when a person avoids anxiety-provoking situations by all means. This is the most common method.
- Dissociation is the ability of the mind to separate and compartmentalize thoughts, memories, and emotions. This is often associated with dissociative disorders and post-traumatic stress syndrome.
- Escape is closely related to avoidance. This technique is often demonstrated by people who experience panic attacks or have phobias. These people want to flee the situation at the first sign of anxiety.
- The use of self-defeating humor means that a person disparages themselves to entertain others. This type of humor has been shown to lead to negative psychological adjustment and exacerbate the effect of existing stressors.
- Procrastination is when a person willingly delays a task to receive a temporary relief from stress. While this may work for short-term relief, when used as a coping mechanism, procrastination causes more issues in the long run.
- Rationalization is the practice of attempting to use reasoning to minimize the severity of an incident, or avoid approaching it in ways that could cause psychological trauma or stress. It most commonly manifests in the form of making excuses for the behavior of the person engaging in the rationalization, or others involved in the situation the person is attempting to rationalize.
- Sensitization is when a person seeks to learn about, rehearse, and/or anticipate fearful events in a protective effort to prevent these events from occurring in the first place.
- Safety behaviors are demonstrated when individuals with anxiety disorders come to rely on something, or someone, as a means of coping with their excessive anxiety.
- Overthinking
- Emotion suppression
- Emotion-driven behavior

=== Further examples ===
Further examples of coping strategies include emotional or instrumental support, self-distraction, denial, substance use, self-blame, behavioral disengagement, and the use of drugs or alcohol.

Many people think that meditation "not only calms our emotions, but...makes us feel more 'together'", as too can "the kind of prayer in which you're trying to achieve an inner quietness and peace".

Low-effort syndrome or low-effort coping refers to the coping responses of a person refusing to work hard. For example, a student at school may learn to put in only minimal effort as they believe that if they put in effort it could unveil their flaws.

Social media influencers have posted their 'rejection spreadsheets' to help inspire others to attempt more projects, share strategies, and celebrate occasional victories.

=== Coping with grief ===
Research indicates the severity of an individual's grief outcome can be diminished with the assistance of supportive and active help-seeking interventions, whereas ignoring the presence of loss amplifies the risk of developing psychological disorders ( e.g. depression, anxiety). At the height of grief, bereavement should be met with initial support from outer networks as grievers are less entitled to seek support for themselves. Avoidance coping increases the prolonged consequences of grief, whereas coping with grief with active and supportive mechanisms reduce acuteness of grief symptoms while influencing a positive posttraumatic growth from the event.

== Historical psychoanalytic theories ==
=== Otto Fenichel ===
Otto Fenichel summarized early psychoanalytic studies of coping mechanisms in children as "a gradual substitution of actions for mere discharge reactions...[&] the development of the function of judgement" – noting however that "behind all active types of mastery of external and internal tasks, a readiness remains to fall back on passive-receptive types of mastery."

In adult cases of "acute and more or less 'traumatic' upsetting events in the life of normal persons", Fenichel stressed that in coping, "in carrying out a 'work of learning' or 'work of adjustment', [s]he must acknowledge the new and less comfortable reality and fight tendencies towards regression, towards the misinterpretation of reality", though such rational strategies "may be mixed with relative allowances for rest and for small regressions and compensatory wish fulfillment, which are recuperative in effect".

=== Karen Horney ===
In the 1940s, the German Freudian psychoanalyst Karen Horney "developed her mature theory in which individuals cope with the anxiety produced by feeling unsafe, unloved, and undervalued by disowning their spontaneous feelings and developing elaborate strategies of defence." Horney defined four so-called coping strategies to define interpersonal relations, one describing psychologically healthy individuals, the others describing neurotic states.

The healthy strategy she termed "Moving with" is that with which psychologically healthy people develop relationships. It involves compromise. In order to move with, there must be communication, agreement, disagreement, compromise, and decisions. The three other strategies she described – "Moving toward", "Moving against" and "Moving away" – represented neurotic, unhealthy strategies people utilize to protect themselves.

Horney investigated these patterns of neurotic needs (compulsive attachments). The neurotics might feel these attachments more strongly because of difficulties within their lives. If the neurotic does not experience these needs, they will experience anxiety. The ten needs are:

1. Affection and approval, the need to please others and be liked.
2. A partner who will take over one's life, based on the idea that love will solve all of one's problems.
3. Restriction of one's life to narrow borders, to be undemanding, satisfied with little, inconspicuous; to simplify one's life.
4. Power, for control over others, for a facade of omnipotence, caused by a desperate desire for strength and dominance.
5. Exploitation of others; to get the better of them.
6. Social recognition or prestige, caused by an abnormal concern for appearances and popularity.
7. Personal admiration.
8. Personal achievement.
9. Self-sufficiency and independence.
10. Perfection and unassailability, a desire to be perfect and a fear of being flawed.

In Compliance, also known as "Moving toward" or the "Self-effacing solution", the individual moves towards those perceived as a threat to avoid retribution and getting hurt, "making any sacrifice, no matter how detrimental." The argument is, "If I give in, I won't get hurt." This means that: if I give everyone I see as a potential threat whatever they want, I will not be injured (physically or emotionally). This strategy includes neurotic needs one, two, and three.

In Withdrawal, also known as "Moving away" or the "Resigning solution", individuals distance themselves from anyone perceived as a threat to avoid getting hurt – "the 'mouse-hole' attitude ... the security of unobtrusiveness." The argument is, "If I do not let anyone close to me, I won't get hurt." A neurotic, according to Horney desires to be distant because of being abused. If they can be the extreme introvert, no one will ever develop a relationship with them. If there is no one around, nobody can hurt them. These "moving away" people fight personality, so they often come across as cold or shallow. This is their strategy. They emotionally remove themselves from society. Included in this strategy are neurotic needs three, nine, and ten.

In Aggression, also known as the "Moving against" or the "Expansive solution", the individual threatens those perceived as a threat to avoid getting hurt. Children might react to parental differences by displaying anger or hostility. This strategy includes neurotic needs four, five, six, seven, and eight.

Related to the work of Karen Horney, public administration scholars developed a classification of coping by frontline workers when working with clients (see also the work of Michael Lipsky on street-level bureaucracy). This coping classification is focused on the behavior workers can display towards clients when confronted with stress. They show that during public service delivery there are three main families of coping:

- Moving towards clients: Coping by helping clients in stressful situations. An example is a teacher working overtime to help students.
- Moving away from clients: Coping by avoiding meaningful interactions with clients in stressful situations. An example is a public servant stating "The office is very busy today, please return tomorrow."
- Moving against clients: Coping by confronting clients. For instance, teachers can cope with stress when working with students by imposing very rigid rules, such as no cellphone use in class and sending everyone to the office when they use a cellphone. Furthermore, aggression towards clients is also included here.

In their systematic review of 35 years of the literature, the scholars found that the most often used family is moving towards clients (43% of all coping fragments). Moving away from clients was found in 38% of all coping fragments and Moving against clients in 19%.

=== Heinz Hartmann ===
In 1937, the psychoanalyst (as well as a physician, psychologist, and psychiatrist) Heinz Hartmann marked it as the evolution of ego psychology by publishing his paper, "Me" (which was later translated into English in 1958, titled, "The Ego and the Problem of Adaptation"). Hartmann focused on the adaptive progression of the ego "through the mastery of new demands and tasks". In fact, according to his adaptive point of view, once infants were born they have the ability to be able to cope with the demands of their surroundings. In his wake, ego psychology further stressed "the development of the personality and of 'ego-strengths'...adaptation to social realities".

=== Object relations ===
Emotional intelligence has stressed the importance of "the capacity to soothe oneself, to shake off rampant anxiety, gloom, or irritability....People who are poor in this ability are constantly battling feelings of distress, while those who excel in it can bounce back far more quickly from life's setbacks and upsets". From this perspective, "the art of soothing ourselves is a fundamental life skill; some psychoanalytic thinkers, such as John Bowlby and D. W. Winnicott see this as the most essential of all psychic tools."

Object relations theory has examined the childhood development both of "independent coping...capacity for self-soothing", and of "aided coping. Emotion-focused coping in infancy is often accomplished through the assistance of an adult."

== Gender differences ==
Gender differences in coping strategies are how men and women differ in managing psychological stress. There is evidence that males often develop stress due to their careers, whereas females often encounter stress due to issues in interpersonal relationships. Early studies indicated that "there were gender differences in the sources of stressors, but gender differences in coping were relatively small after controlling for the source of stressors"; and more recent work has similarly revealed "small differences between women's and men's coping strategies when studying individuals in similar situations."

Men are anticipated to respond to stressors independently, whereas women are often encouraged to rely on support to reduce prolonged psychological distress. Recent studies acknowledge levels of self-esteem as a factor in the decision to react with a problem-focused or emotion-focused approach to stressors.

In general, such differences as exist indicate that women tend to employ emotion-focused coping and the "tend-and-befriend" stress response, whereas men tend to use problem-focused coping and the "fight-or-flight" response, perhaps because societal standards encourage men to be more individualistic, while women are often expected to be interpersonal. An alternative explanation for the aforementioned differences involves genetic factors. The degree to which genetic factors and social conditioning influence behavior is the subject of ongoing debate.

== Physiological basis ==
Hormones also play a part in stress management. Cortisol, a stress hormone, was found to be elevated in males during stressful situations. In females, however, cortisol levels were decreased in stressful situations, and instead, an increase in limbic activity was discovered.

Many researchers believe that these results underlie the reasons why men exhibit a fight-or-flight reaction to stress, whereas females have a tend-and-befriend reaction. The "fight-or-flight" response activates the sympathetic nervous system in the form of increased focus levels, adrenaline, and epinephrine. Conversely, the "tend-and-befriend" reaction refers to the tendency of women to protect their offspring and relatives.

Although these two reactions support a genetic basis to differences in behavior, one should not assume that in general females cannot implement "fight-or-flight" behavior or that males cannot implement "tend-and-befriend" behavior. Additionally, this study implied differing health impacts for each gender as a result of the contrasting stress processes.

== See also ==
- Adaptive performance
- Communal coping
- Dyscopia
- Defence mechanisms § Level 4: mature
- Emotional eating
- Emotional intelligence
- Experiential avoidance
- Grief
- Invisible support
- Life skills
- Mindfulness-based stress reduction
- Music as a coping strategy
- Psychological resilience
- Psychological trauma
- Self-compassion
- Self-concealment
- Self-control
- Self-deception
- Social sharing of emotions
- Stiff upper lip
- Stigma management
- Stimming
- Stress
- Stress management

== Sources ==
- Harrington, Rick (2013). Stress, health & well-being thriving in the 21st century. Cengage Learning. ISBN 978-1-111-83161-5. OCLC 781848419.
- Folkman, Susan; Moskowitz, Judith Tedlie (February 2004). "Coping: Pitfalls and Promise". Annual Review of Psychology. 55 (1): 745–774. doi:10.1146/annurev.psych.55.090902.141456. PMID 14744233.
