= Safety behaviour =

Safety behaviour is behaviour associated with safety. It may refer to:

- Behavior-based safety, improving safety by monitoring and changing the behaviour of the people involved
- Safety behaviors (anxiety), stress-relieving activity performed by anxious people
- Safety culture, general attitudes to safety at workplaces and dangerous activities
- Risk compensation, adjusting behavior depending on perceived level of safety (or risk)
