= Emotional eating =

Eating in response to emotions

Emotional eating, also known as stress eating, comfort eating and emotional overeating, is defined as the "propensity to eat in response to positive and negative emotions". While the term commonly refers to eating as a means of coping with negative emotions, it sometimes includes eating for positive emotions, such as overeating when celebrating an event or to enhance an already good mood.

== Background ==
Emotional eating includes eating in response to any emotion, whether that be positive or negative. Most frequently, people refer to emotional eating as "eating to cope with negative emotions." In these situations, emotional eating can be considered a form of disordered eating, which is defined as "an increase in food intake in response to negative emotions" and can be considered a maladaptive strategy. More specifically, emotional eating in order to relieve negative emotions would qualify as a form of emotion-focused coping, which attempts to minimize, regulate, and prevent emotional distress.

Recent meta-analysis suggest that the prevalence of negative emotional eating in middle-aged adults is approximately 16%.One study found that emotional eating sometimes does not reduce emotional distress, but instead it enhances emotional distress by sparking feelings of intense guilt after an emotional eating session. Those who eat as a coping strategy are at an especially high risk of developing binge-eating disorder, and those with eating disorders are at a higher risk to engage in emotional eating as a means to cope. In a clinical setting, emotional eating can be assessed by the Dutch Eating Behavior Questionnaire, which contains a scale for restrained, emotional, and external eating. Other questionnaires, such as the Palatable Eating Motives Scale, can determine reasons why a person eats tasty foods when they are not hungry; sub-scales include eating for reward enhancement, coping, social, and conformity.

== Characteristics ==
Emotional eating usually occurs when one is attempting to satisfy their hedonic drive, or the drive to eat palatable food to obtain pleasure in the absence of an energy deficit but can also occur when one is seeking food as a reward, eating for social reasons (such as eating at a party), eating to conform (which involves eating because friends or family wants the individual to), or eating to regulate inner emotional states. When one is engaging in emotional eating, they are usually seeking out energy-dense foods rather than just food in general, which may result in weight gain. In some cases, emotional eating can lead to something called "mindless eating" during which the individual is eating without being mindful of what or how much they are consuming; this can occur during both positive and negative settings.

Emotional hunger does not originate from the stomach, such as with a rumbling or growling stomach, but tends to start when a person thinks about a craving or wants something specific to eat. Emotional responses are also different. Giving in to a craving or eating because of stress can cause feelings of regret, shame, or guilt, and these responses tend to be associated with emotional hunger. On the other hand, satisfying a physical hunger is giving the body the nutrients or calories it needs to function and is not associated with negative feelings.

== Major theories behind eating to cope ==
Current research suggests that certain individual factors may increase one's likelihood of using emotional eating as a coping strategy. The inadequate affect regulation theory posits that individuals engage in emotional eating because they believe overeating alleviates negative feelings. Escape theory builds upon inadequate affect regulation theory by suggesting that people not only overeat to cope with negative emotions, but they find that overeating diverts their attention away from a stimulus that is threatening self-esteem to focus on a pleasurable stimulus like food. Restraint theory suggests that overeating as a result of negative emotions occurs among individuals who already restrain their eating. While these individuals typically limit what they eat, when they are faced with negative emotions they cope by engaging in emotional eating. Restraint theory supports the idea that individuals with other eating disorders are more likely to engage in emotional eating. Together these three theories suggest that an individual's aversion to negative emotions, particularly negative feelings that arise in response to a threat to the ego or intense self-awareness, increase the propensity for the individual to utilize emotional eating as a means of coping with this aversion.

The biological stress response may also contribute to the development of emotional eating tendencies. In a crisis, corticotropin-releasing hormone (CRH) is secreted by the hypothalamus, suppressing appetite and triggering the release of glucocorticoids from the adrenal gland. These steroid hormones increase appetite and, unlike CRH, remain in the bloodstream for a prolonged period of time, often resulting in hyperphagia. Those who experience this biologically instigated increase in appetite during times of stress are therefore primed to rely on emotional eating as a coping mechanism.

== Contributing factors ==
=== Negative affect ===
Overall, high levels of the negative affect trait are related to emotional eating. Negative affectivity is a personality trait involving negative emotions and poor self-concept. Negative emotions experienced within negative affect include anger, guilt, and nervousness. It has been found that certain negative affect regulation scales predicted emotional eating. An inability to articulate and identify one's emotions made the individual feel inadequate at regulating negative affect and thus more likely to engage in emotional eating as a means for coping with those negative emotions. Further scientific studies regarding the relationship between negative affect and eating find that, after experiencing a stressful event, food consumption is associated with reduced feelings of negative affect (i.e. feeling less bad) for those enduring high levels of chronic stress. This relationship between eating and feeling better suggests a self-reinforcing cyclical pattern between high levels of chronic stress and consumption of highly palatable foods as a coping mechanism. Contrarily, a study conducted by Spoor et al. found that negative affect is not significantly related to emotional eating, but the two are indirectly associated through emotion-focused coping and avoidance-distraction behaviors. While the scientific results differed somewhat, they both suggest that negative affect does play a role in emotional eating but it may be accounted for by other variables.

=== Childhood development ===
For some people, emotional eating is a learned behavior. During childhood, their parents give them treats to help them deal with a tough day or situation, or as a reward for something good. Over time, the child who reaches for a cookie after getting a bad grade on a test may become an adult who grabs a box of cookies after a rough day at work. In an example such as this, the roots of emotional eating are deep, which can make breaking the habit extremely challenging. In some cases, individuals may eat in order to conform; for example, individuals may be told "you have to finish your plate" and the individual may eat past the point in which they feel satisfied.

At the same time, stress and negative emotions can cause different effects on appetite. While some children and adults experience an increase in appetite, others experience a decrease. This situation is terminologically referred to as emotional overeating (EOE) and emotional undereating (EUE). As observed in the Gemini twin study, EOE and EUE stem not from genes as expected, but generally from the early childhood environment; shared environmental influences played a significant role in both EOE and EUE. Non-shared environmental factors also had a moderate impact. Interestingly, the shared environmental factors were the only ones common to both behaviors, as neither genetic nor non-shared environmental correlations were found to be significant in this context.

Also a positive correlation between EOE and EUE, certain children have a tendency to both overeat and undereat as reactions to stress. The findings indicate that both EOE and EUE behaviors are primarily learned during childhood, with the environment shared among family members having the most significant impact. Genetic factors played a minimal and also insignificant role in these behaviors.

=== Related disorders ===
Emotional eating as a means to cope may be a precursor to developing eating disorders such as binge eating or bulimia nervosa. The relationship between emotional eating and other disorders is largely due to the fact that emotional eating and these disorders share key characteristics. More specifically, they are both related to emotion focused coping, maladaptive coping strategies, and a strong aversion to negative feelings and stimuli. The causal direction has not been definitively established, meaning that while emotional eating is considered a precursor to these eating disorders, it also may be the consequence of these disorders. The latter hypothesis that emotional eating happens in response to another eating disorder is supported by research that has shown emotional eating to be more common among individuals already suffering from bulimia nervosa.

Additionally, in a study involving children diagnosed with ADHD (Attention-Deficit/Hyperactivity Disorder) or ASD (Autism Spectrum Disorder), it was observed that both ADHD and ASD-diagnosed children had more issues in their eating behaviors compared to children without any diagnosis. It was suggested that children with ADHD might experience higher instances of emotional overeating (EOE) and emotional undereating (EUE) compared to those without any diagnosis. In the case of children with ASD there seems to be a higher likelihood of experiencing EUE.

=== Biological and environmental factors ===
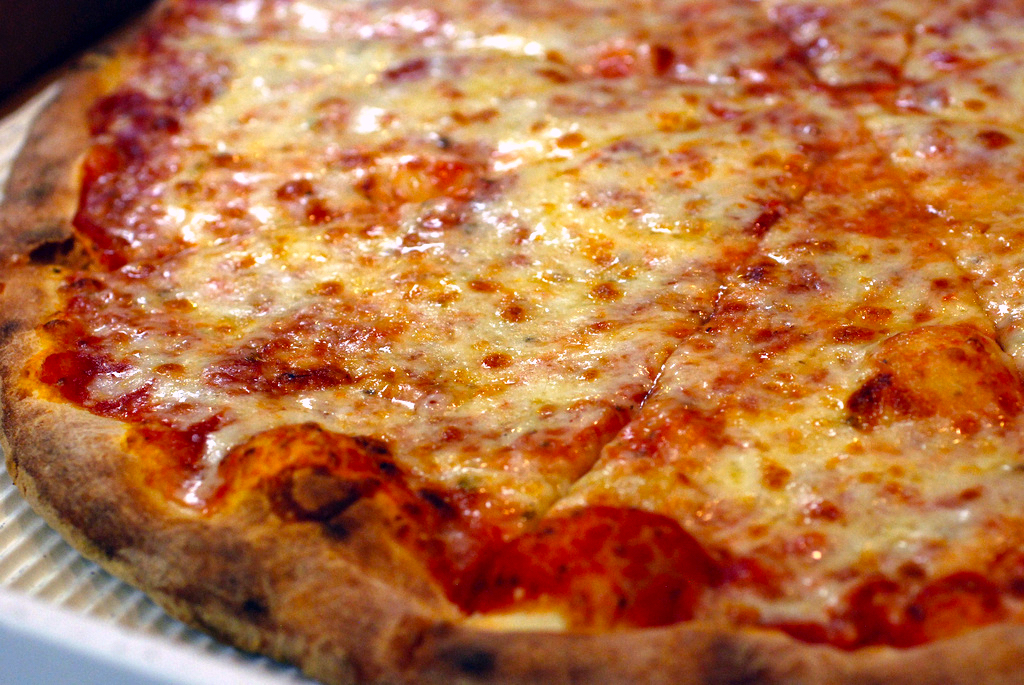
Fatty, energy-dense foods such as pizza can counteract stress, but can create addiction problems

Stress affects food preferences. Numerous studies — granted, many of them in animals — have shown that physical or emotional distress increases the intake of food high in fat, sugar, or both, even in the absence of caloric deficits. Once ingested, fat- and sugar-filled foods seem to have a feedback effect that damps stress-related responses and emotions, as these foods trigger dopamine and opioid releases, which protect against the negative consequences of stress. These foods really are "comfort" foods in that they seem to counteract stress, but rat studies demonstrate that intermittent access to and consumption of these highly palatable foods creates symptoms that resemble opioid withdrawal, suggesting that high-fat and high-sugar foods can become neurologically addictive. A few examples from the American diet would include: hamburgers, pizza, French fries, sausages and savory pasties. The most common food preferences are in decreasing order from: sweet energy-dense food, non-sweet energy-dense food then, fruits and vegetables. This may contribute to people's stress-induced craving for those foods.

The stress response is a highly-individualized reaction and personal differences in physiological reactivity may also contribute to the development of emotional eating habits. Women are more likely than men to resort to eating as a coping mechanism for stress, as are obese individuals and those with histories of dietary restraint. In one study, women were exposed to an hour-long social stressor task or a neutral control condition. The women were exposed to each condition on different days. After the tasks, the women were invited to a buffet with both healthy and unhealthy snacks. Those who had high chronic stress levels and a low cortisol reactivity to the acute stress task consumed significantly more calories from chocolate cake than women with low chronic stress levels after both control and stress conditions. High cortisol levels, in combination with high insulin levels, may be responsible for stress-induced eating, as research shows high cortisol reactivity is associated with hyperphagia, an abnormally increased appetite for food, during stress. Furthermore, since glucocorticoids trigger hunger and specifically increase one's appetite for high-fat and high-sugar foods, those whose adrenal glands naturally secrete larger quantities of glucocorticoids in response to a stressor are more inclined toward hyperphagia. Additionally, those whose bodies require more time to clear the bloodstream of excess glucocorticoids are similarly predisposed.

These biological factors can interact with environmental elements to further trigger hyperphagia. Frequent intermittent stressors trigger repeated, sporadic releases of glucocorticoids in intervals too short to allow for a complete return to baseline levels, leading to sustained and elevated levels of appetite. Therefore, those whose lifestyles or careers entail frequent intermittent stressors over prolonged periods of time thus have greater biological incentive to develop patterns of emotional eating, which puts them at risk for long-term adverse health consequences such as weight gain or cardiovascular disease.

Macht (2008) described a five-way model to explain the reasoning behind stressful eating: (1) emotional control of food choice, (2) emotional suppression of food intake, (3) impairment of cognitive eating controls, (4) eating to regulate emotions, and (5) emotion-congruent modulation of eating. These break down into subgroups of: Coping, reward enhancement, social and conformity motive. Thus, providing an individual with are stronger understanding of personal emotional eating.

=== Positive affect ===
Geliebter and Aversa (2003) conducted a study comparing individuals of three weight groups: underweight, normal weight and overweight. Both positive and negative emotions were evaluated. When individuals were experiencing positive emotional states or situations, the underweight group reporting eating more than the other two groups. As an explanation, the typical nature of underweight individuals is to eat less and during times of stress to eat even less. However, when positive emotional states or situations arise, individuals are more likely to indulge themselves with food.

== Impact ==
Emotional eating may qualify as avoidant coping and/or emotion-focused coping. As coping methods that fall under these broad categories focus on temporary reprieve rather than practical resolution of stressors, they can initiate a vicious cycle of maladaptive behavior reinforced by fleeting relief from stress. Additionally, in the presence of high insulin levels characteristic of the recovery phase of the stress-response, glucocorticoids trigger the creation of an enzyme that stores away the nutrients circulating in the bloodstream after an episode of emotional eating as visceral fat, or fat located in the abdominal area. Therefore, those who struggle with emotional eating are at greater risk for abdominal obesity, which is in turn linked to a greater risk for metabolic and cardiovascular disease.

== Treatment ==
There are numerous ways in which individuals can reduce emotional distress without engaging in emotional eating as a means to cope. The most salient choice is to minimize maladaptive coping strategies and to maximize adaptive strategies. A study conducted by Corstorphine et al. in 2007 investigated the relationship between distress tolerance and disordered eating. These researchers specifically focused on how different coping strategies impact distress tolerance and disordered eating. They found that individuals who engage in disordered eating often employ emotional avoidance strategies. If an individual is faced with strong negative emotions, they may choose to avoid the situation by distracting themselves through overeating. Discouraging emotional avoidance is thus an important facet to emotional eating treatment. The most obvious way to limit emotional avoidance is to confront the issue through techniques like problem solving. Corstorphine et al. showed that individuals who engaged in problem solving strategies enhance one's ability to tolerate emotional distress. Since emotional distress is correlated to emotional eating, the ability to better manage one's negative affect should allow an individual to cope with a situation without resorting to overeating.

One way to combat emotional eating is to employ mindfulness techniques. For example, approaching cravings with a nonjudgmental inquisitiveness can help differentiate between hunger and emotionally-driven cravings. An individual may ask themselves if the craving developed rapidly, as emotional eating tends to be triggered spontaneously. An individual may also take the time to note their bodily sensations, such as hunger pangs, and coinciding emotions, like guilt or shame, in order to make conscious decisions to avoid emotional eating.

Emotional eating can also be improved by evaluating physical facets like hormone balance. Female hormones, in particular, can alter cravings and even self-perception of one's body. Additionally, emotional eating can be exacerbated by social pressure to be thin. The focus on thinness and dieting in our culture can make young girls, especially, vulnerable to falling into food restriction and subsequent emotional eating behavior.

Emotional eating disorder predisposes individuals to more serious eating disorders and physiological complications. Therefore, combatting disordered eating before such progression takes place has become the focus of many clinical psychologists.

== Emotional undereating ==
In a lesser percentage of individuals, emotional eating may conversely consist of eating less, called stress fasting or emotional undereating. This is believed to result from the fight-or-flight response. In some individuals, depression and other psychological disorders can also lead to emotional fasting or starvation.

While emotional overeating is typically the focal point in addressing emotional eating issues, some individuals experience symptoms of emotional eating as undereating, self-deprivation, or decreased appetite. Additionally, emotional overeating and undereating issues generally arise during the preschool years.

Understanding the childhood indicators of emotional overeating (EOE) and emotional undereating (EUE) is crucial as both cause various negative health impacts. For instance, studies have found young people with restrictive eating disorders had permanently stunted height growth. EOE is generally associated with excess weight, while EUE is linked to lower weight. Despite their different connections to weight, these two conditions exhibit a positive correlation. Additionally, some children tend to display tendencies toward both EOE and EUE in response to stressful situations. So that means if a child who emotionally overeats also tends to emotionally under-eat as well.

The study conducted on twins revealed that shared environment is one of the factors underlying EOE and EUE. Genetic factors had less impact than expected, playing only a 7% role, whereas the shared environment accounted for a substantial 91% influence. The family environment emerged as a significant factor in shaping a child's eating behaviors. It was found that children whose families use food to calm them have a higher likelihood of experiencing EOE. Moreover, pressuring children to eat, imposing strict rules, or placing restrictions on how much they eat were also associated with EOE. Another study highlighted that lack of social support and a negative family environment were more closely linked to EUE. For instance, there's a higher probability of EUE in children from hostile family relationships, and in many women diagnosed with anorexia, the lack of social support and childhood EUE were observed.

== See also ==
- Comfort food
- Food addiction
- Hedonic hunger
- Overeating
- Social determinants of health
