= Communal coping =

Communal coping is the collective effort of members of a connected network (familial or social) to manage a distressing event (Lyons, Michelson, Sullivan and Coyne, 1998). This definition and the scope of the concept positions communal coping as an offshoot of social support. According to Lyons et al. (1998), the communal coping conceptual framework emerged for two reasons. First, to expand the research that supports the claim that the coping process sometimes requires individual and collective effort (e.g. Fukuyama, 1995). Second, the need for a specific framework for investigating the cooperative characteristic of coping. To support the need for a framework which explores the social aspect of coping as a combined effort, the authors argued that the communal coping conceptual framework emphasizes the connectedness and reliance on personal network for coping. Developments to the communal coping framework include the explanation of the complex nature of the communal coping process (Afifi, Helgeson & Krouse, 2006) and specific personal outcomes (Helgeson, Jakubiak, Vleet, & Zajdel, 2018) following a communal coping process.

== Background ==
Lyons et al. (1998) introduced the communal coping framework. The first model Lyons et al. (1998) proposed mainly distinguished between communal coping and existing perception of coping as an individualistic or prosocial process. Also, the model provided a lens for examining other aspects of coping such as the benefits, cost and influential factors. Afifi, Hutchinson, and Krouse (2006) noted some of the achievements of the model is that it accounts for the relational process within coping and shifts the focus of researchers from treating the phenomenon as mainly a psychological process but also a relational or communication.

However, despite the contributions of the model to the coping research, some questions still need an answer and a couple of research challenges remained unaddressed. For instance, Afifi et al. (2006) noted some researchers confused the process of communal coping for collective coping, types, provision and seeking of social support. The scholars attributed the lack of conceptualization of communal coping as one of the factors responsible for the confusion. To address this gap in research and advance the existing model by Lyon's and colleagues, Afifi et al. proposed a theoretical framework. The scholars anticipated the model will serve as a template for measuring communal coping.

The goals for designing the new model were specifically to understand the communal coping process within naturally occurring groups (e.g. postdivorce families). Through the new model, Afifi et al. (2006) attempted to (a) provide a description of the complexities that characterize relying on other people to cope with a stressful event; (b) expand the discourse on the dynamic and interactive nature of the coping process; (c) explore the various factors that contribute to stressors within groups; (d) identify how characteristics of the group such as its structure, the beliefs, norms, and perspectives of its members are likely to influence the coping process and; (e) examine how context, source, and nature of the stressor impact the coping process. The refinement of the model addressed the problems Lyon and colleagues’ model could not account for. Nonetheless, one question remained unanswered ‘how does communal coping influence coping outcome?'. Thereby still leaving a gap in research. Helgeson, Jakubiak, Vleet, and Zajdel (2018) attempted to fill this gap by proposing a model that acknowledges the adjustment process and outcome of communal coping.

Similar to prior models, Helgeson et al’s (2018) framework identified supportive communication as a significant aspect of communal coping that is linked to individual adjustment to a stressor (e.g. illness). A core tenet within the model is that communication enhances coping outcomes. In this vein, Helgeson et al’s model purports the outcomes of communal coping for stressed individuals include (a) a high sense of control over the stressor; (b) perception of the stressor as less stressful; (c) enhanced feeling of self- regulatory capacity and (d) experiencing quality relationships.

== Components of communal coping ==
The existing research on coping (Lazarus & Folkman, 1984) served as a backdrop for the development of the communal coping framework. Zimmer-Gembeck and Skinner (2009, p. 333) defined coping as “how people of all ages mobilize, guide, manage, coordinate, energize, modulate, and direct their behavior, emotion, and orientation (or how they fail to do so) during stressful encounters”. From this definition, one can infer coping researchers consider the management of a stressor as an individual effort. In addition, despite the significant contribution of coping studies to empirical knowledge in research areas such as coping resources (Lazarus & Folkman, 1980) and maintaining these resources (Hobbfall, 1989) it is still important to understand how collective coping efforts could make a difference in coping outcome of collective stressors such as the death of a breadwinner, natural disasters, environmental hazards, and epidemics. During these kinds of events, the desire to cope may not necessarily be for self-interest but the preservation of existing relationships and promoting the wellbeing of others that are affected. In these cases, collectively coping as part of a community or family supersedes individual effort to manage the distress. In this vein, Lyons et al. (1998) suggested the components of communal coping are salient and activated in such situations where at least one person treats the distressing event as ‘our problem’. Therefore, the components of the communal coping process require a communal coping orientation, communication about the stressor and cooperative action to address the stressor.

The components of communal coping may be defined as active steps towards achieving a positive coping outcome as part of a social unit. Lyons et al. (1998) proposed these active steps begin with one person adopting a communal orientation about how to manage the distressing event. The outcome of this action is the individuals involve share a mutual understanding of how to manage and overcome the stressor as a social unit versus ‘your problem’ where a specific individual is responsible for managing and overcoming the stressor. The actualization of this first step largely depends on and is completed through communication. In other words, the individuals involved need to communicate about the stressor.

Communication allows for a conversation about the situation, circumstances, and likely solutions. The conversations at this point may be controlled by the individual experiencing the stressor to inform members of their network who are willing to share responsibility for the stressor on how the issue should be addressed. Or, the conversation may be controlled by members of the personal network of the individual experiencing the stressor to negotiate their involvement in how to manage the stress. Irrespective of the direction the communication takes, the primary goal is to share a common sense of responsibility for the stressor as “our problem” among the people involved.

The outcome of the first two steps le toad the emergence of a sense of cooperative action. At this point, everyone works cooperatively to create strategies for alleviating the problem or stressor. Given that there is a likelihood for the processes of the three components of communal coping to unfold differently across situations and for affected individuals, it is not unusual to find differences in communal coping styles. Some of the factors responsible for these differences include the sense of obligation experienced by the connected individuals (Stack 1974) or compassion for others (Nussbam, 1990); the type and purpose of the relationship as well as the characteristics of the individual in the leadership role and personalities of members within the communal coping network (Lyon et al. 1998). However, despite these differences in coping styles, communal coping is beneficial for the management of and recovery from a distressing event

== Influences on communal coping ==
Lyon et al. (1998) suggested four factors that influence how people use communal coping – situation, cultural context, characteristics of the personal relationship and sex. For instance, in a study on the role of marriage on health behaviors, Lewis, McBride, Pollak et al. (2006) discovered the transformation of motivation influenced how one chooses to help the other cope through a stressor. The scholars argued that in the case of romantic relationships, one partner's mere realization that a stressor (e.g. health threat) poses a danger to relationship quality could motivate the need for communal coping.

In addition, the perceived salience of communal coping within certain situations is defined by the severity of the stressor. Therefore, the ways individuals define the severity of a problem are likely dependent on (a) the priority or relevance attached to the problem (b) if they are directly or indirectly affected and (c) the decision whether to employ an individual or collective coping strategy. In this vein, following their studies on communal coping within postdivorce families, Afifi, Hutchinson, and Krouse (2006, p. 399) argued the “specific demands or requirement of a stressor” influence the communal coping process.

The cultural context in which the distressing event occur also influence the salience of communal coping in alleviating the stressor. The concepts of collectivism and individualism are often used in cultural comparative studies about a phenomenon. Cultures that promote group interest (collectivist cultures) over personal goals (individualist culture) are more likely to invest in communal coping (see Bryer, 1986). Given that culture is a way of life, it reflects in the performance of our relationships such as how we define close relationships and depend on these relationships (Lyons et al., 1998). Therefore, one can conclude that relationships in which strong relational ties exist will perhaps guarantee better performance of communal coping than relationships without strong relational ties.

Moreover, the language of the affected individual also influences the coping process. Researchers (e.g. Rohrbaugh, Shoham, Skoyen, Jensen, and Mehl, 2012) labeled communal coping language as ‘we – talk’. In their studies of addiction and cessation (cigarette and alcohol) due to health threats, Rohrbaugh and colleagues discovered the pronoun used by couples in their study influenced the communal coping outcomes. In the cases where couples defined the addiction as “our problem” versus “your problem” or “my problem”, there were implicit adaptive problem-solving outcomes.

Lastly, gender roles influence the performance of communal coping. Wells, Hobfoll and Lavin (1997) suggested the multiple roles some women take on tend to result in stressors. However, Women tend to be the fervent giver of social support making members of this gender community an active performer in the communal coping process (Vaux 1985, Bem 1993). Lyon et al. (1998) noted women's tendency to give social support to others supersedes receiving support as maintaining relationship quality is important for this group. The downside to this sense of responsibility is women manage and overcome their stressor alone which take an emotional and psychological toll.

== Benefits of communal coping ==
Adapting the communal coping strategy after a distressing event is beneficial for the coping process itself, the self and relationships (Afifi, Helgeson & Krouse, 2006). As a beneficial strategy for the coping process communal coping holds the potential to allow connected individuals to increase their resources and ability to deal with the situation. For example, a single stressful event may require reliance on other people or the exploration of others’ financial resources to cope with the situation.

Another significant benefit of communal coping as a coping strategy is the facilitation of emotional social support which in turn facilitates psychological wellbeing. Individuals who can share their emotional distress with others are less likely to experience depression and burnout (Williamson & Shultz, 1990)or commit suicide (LaSalle, 1995).

Under certain circumstances, the constant encouragement of communal coping among connected individuals promotes a likelihood of consistent availability of social support. In these cases, communal coping may serve as a form of long-term investment. The last two statements are not intended to categorize communal coping and social support as the same phenomenon but rather to argue that the former creates a conducive social and relational climate for the later. According to Lyons et al. (1998), some of the long-term investments of communal coping may result in rewards such as food and money.

Moreover, in the event of a common disaster such as earthquakes and wars, communal coping allows the people involved to experience a sense of ‘solidarity’ or a feeling of ‘I am not the only victim’. This realization promotes mutual disclosure among all the affected individuals, a behavior found to buffer stress as well as ameliorate negative feelings and concerns (Pennebaker & Haber, 1993). In their study on how the process of communal coping unfolds after social support resources have diminished, Richardson and Maninger (2016) discovered that a sense of mutuality and shared problem increased.

Taken together, there is enough evidence that communal coping has a significant impact on relationships. These impacts are evident in the development and maintenance of relationships; the desire or obligation to cater to the wellbeing of others and the collective good (Lyon et al., 1998). Perhaps, in well-established relationships, communal coping is likely to strengthen relationship characteristics such as trust. For instance, the confidence that people within a connected network will exchange support during or after a distressing situation promotes a sense of dependence which may improve the quality of a relationship.

Lyons and colleagues argued the actualization of relationship development and maintenance regarding relational trust or improving relationship quality emerge from a sense of compassion (empathy-driven) or obligation (responsibility – driven) towards the wellbeing of others in the relationship. Although empathy-driven and obligation – driven motives are distinct based on the type of relational tie, in most cases the end goal is for the collective good.

The benefits of communal coping described to this point focus on the intention to meet the emotional need of others during a stressful life event. However, the self can also benefit from participating in the process. There is a likelihood for the person offering empathy-driven or obligation – driven support to experience a sense of fulfillment. Lyons et al. (1998) used social integration and excitement to explain self-benefits of communal coping. In their explanation of social integration as a benefit of communal coping, Lyons et al. noted people who consider themselves resourceful in the coping process of others consider themselves competent, valued, loved and indispensable. In the same vein, communal coping fosters a sense of togetherness and cooperation. Excitement usually results from a sense of togetherness and cooperation that yield positive results.

Given that people and resources such as money, time and goods are exchanged in the process of communal coping during certain stressful events, there is a likelihood for some of the individuals involved to experience discomfort. Lyons et al. (1998) alluded to this discomfort as costs of communal coping.

== Costs of communal coping ==
A significant characteristic of communal coping is 'dependency'. Cultural (collectivism versus individualism) and social factors play into how we expect others to depend on us and how much we are willing to depend on others. Communal coping will perhaps be perceived as a cost in situations where there is a lack of mutual understanding and expectation within a social unit consisting of members experiencing a common or personal stressful event. In such instances, Lyon et al. noted individuals in the social unit will need to deal with issues such as equity and individual-adaptation.

The equity problem arises from a lack of agreement or existing social norms on the expectation of individual efforts channeled towards communal coping. In a comparison of gender roles after a distressing event, women specifically wives and mothers were expected to hold higher responsibility for helping others manage and recover from a stressor. More so, given that communal coping requires significant reliance on other people, individuals who are used to this style of coping during or after a stressful event may experience trouble adapting to a situation or circumstance in the absence of someone to rely on. There is evidence for this in studies about how people embedded in a strong community experience difficulty after a change of location for the pursuit of life goals.

One drastic consequence of communal coping is the possibility of stress contagion to occur. In this case, rather than working towards alleviating the stressor, connected individuals wallow in negative emotions and feelings. This behavior escalates old and fosters new stressors for all the people involved. These factor provide evidence that the communal coping process follows a complicated pattern likely to yield contradictory results. Even more, some complex factors influence how people use communal coping. The complex nature of these factors is evident in how they are not universal or consistent.

== Concept application ==
The communal coping framework is relatively new and there has not been much variation in the context to which the concept has been applied. Mickelson, Lyons, Sullivan and Coyne (2001) argue for the need to apply the communal coping conceptual framework to less collective stressors such as recovery from natural disaster (e.g. Richardson & Maninger, 2018) to more individualistic stressors such as job loss and illness (e.g. Vleet, Helgeson, Seltman, Korytwoski, Hausmann, 2018). Scholars who have attempted to apply the communal coping framework to context outside of illness and natural disaster have looked at the concept in relation to relational transgression (Pederson & Faw, 2019); the experience of athletes and members of their family (Nelly, McHugh, Dun & Holt, 2017) and; the experience of refugees (Afifi, Afifi, Merill & Nimah, 2016).

== Concept critique ==
The communal coping framework is very dynamic in the sense that it can be applied to distinct research contexts yet facilitate empirical and general knowledge that aligns with the tenets of its models. This strength also lies in the weakness of the framework. Some scholars within the distinct field to which the concept has been applied propose models for communal coping with little to significant variations. For instance, Lyons and colleagues (1998) from the field of psychology proposed the first model. Their model served as a backdrop for the emergence of other models from experts in communication (Afifi, Helgeson & Krouse, 2006); sociology and anthropology (Helgeson, Jakubiak, Vleet, & Zajdel, 2018). Keefe, LeFevbre, Egert, et al. (2000) also advocated for a communal coping model of pain catastrophizing. With the growth in the application of the conceptual framework, it might be beneficial to consider developing a model for studying the phenomenon that can be used across all fields or areas of research. A probable benefit of this suggestion is the promotion of jointly agreed conceptualization of the communal coping phenomenon.
