= Hedonic hunger =

Drive to eat for pleasure rather than sustenance

Hedonic hunger or hedonic hyperphagia is the "drive to eat to obtain pleasure in the absence of an energy deficit". Particular foods may have a high "hedonic rating" or individuals may have increased susceptibility to environmental food cues. Weight loss programs may aim to control or to compensate for hedonic hunger. Therapeutic interventions may influence hedonic eating behavior.

== Background ==
Although hunger may arise from energy or nutrient deficits, as would be expected in the set-point theories of hunger and eating, hunger may arise more commonly from anticipated pleasure of eating, consistent with the positive-incentive perspective. Gramlich distinguished the overeating responses to these stimuli as homeostatic hyperphagia and hedonic hyperphagia respectively. Accordingly, hunger and eating are subject to feedback control from homeostatic, hedonic, and cognitive processes. Although these mechanisms interplay and overlap to some extent, they can nonetheless be individually separated. Thus, the positive-incentive perspective suggests that eating is similar to sexual behavior: humans engage in sexual behavior, not because of an internal deficit, but because they have evolved in a way that makes them crave it. High calorie foods have had intrinsic reward value throughout evolution. The presence of desirable (or "hedonic") food, or the mere anticipation of it, makes one hungry. The psychological effects of hedonic hunger may be the appetitive equivalent of hedonically driven activities such as recreational drug use and compulsive gambling. Susceptibility to food cues can lead to overeating in a society of readily available calorie dense, inexpensive foods. Such hedonistic eating overrides the body's ability to regulate consumption with satiety. While there is a breadth of evidence for hedonic hunger, this topic is not without controversy. For example, recent evidence suggests that there is no relationship between milkshake liking and body mass index (BMI).

A related phenomenon, specific appetite, also known as specific hunger, is conceptually related to, but distinct from, hedonic hunger. Specific appetite is a drive to eat foods with specific flavors or other characteristics: in usage, specific appetite has put greater emphasis on an individual who adaptationally learns a particular appetite behavior rather than an evolutionarily innate, hedonic appetite preference.

== Food variability ==
A "hedonic rating" of foods reflects those individuals are more likely to eat even though they are not hungry. For example, functional magnetic resonance imaging (fMRI) scanning suggests that fed rats show a high preference for a mixture of fat and carbohydrate in the form of potato chips compared to their standard chow or single macronutrient foods. When binge eating occurs without the presence of energy deprivation, researchers think it is due to frequent exposure to palatable food. Another study evaluated how hedonic ratings of individual foods aggregate into the food components of particular types of meals, and related preferences to overall dietary intake.

== Interpersonal variability ==
Individuals may have increased hedonic hunger susceptibility to environmental food cues. Genetic variability may influence hedonic hyperphagia. Variation in hedonic hunger levels from person to person may be key in determining success in weight loss tactics and a person's ability to cope with tempting foods that are readily available. To assess this, a Power of Food Scale (PFS) has been developed that quantifies a person's appetitive anticipation (not consumption). Binge-eaters, obese individuals and those with eating disorders such as anorexia nervosa scored higher than restrictive type and normal weight college students. A decrease in PFS score leads to better success in weight loss.

== Food reinforcement ==
The reinforcing value of food refers to how hard someone is willing to work to obtain food. Food reinforcement is influenced by several factors including food palatability, food deprivation, and food variety. It is also motivated by concerns about fullness (expected satiation) and the hunger that might be experienced in the intervening period between meals (expected satiety). The effector mechanisms of food reinforcement depend on dopaminergic activity in the brain.

== Treatment ==
Conceptually, weight loss programs might target control of hedonic hunger. Specific research to determine what diet techniques would be most beneficial for those with an increased hedonic hunger would help people modify their immediate availability of food or its palatability. For example, whole grain popcorn may be a better choice than potato chips due to a lower calorie load and an increased sense of satiety. Adding dietary fiber to foods and beverages increases satiety and reduces energy intake at the next meal. Low-energy-density foods with high satiating power may be useful tools for weight management. Satiety has been found to be greater with yogurt beverages than fruit juice, and was equal with low-energy-density yogurt with inulin and high-energy-density yogurt. People with high PFS scores may do better with meal replacement products.

Medications may affect hedonic eating behavior. Glucagon-like peptide-1 (GLP1) agonists, such as exenatide and liraglutide, which are used for diabetes, may help suppress food reward behavior. Inhibition of dopamine transport within the brain increases dopamine concentrations, which can reduce energy intake. Despite theoretical underpinnings, opiate antagonists as single agents have generally not shown substantial clinical benefit. However, preliminary data has suggested synergistic effects with concurrent targeted therapy of opiate receptors and either dopamine or cannabinoid receptors.

Bariatric surgery of various types may influence hedonic hunger particularly if accompanied by counseling interventions that reduce automatic hedonic impulses. These surgeries may work in part by modifying the production of gastrointestinal hormones, particularly by increasing glucagon-like peptide-1 and peptide YY (PYY); reduction of ghrelin has been inconsistent.

== Physiological mechanisms ==
Hedonic hunger show a positive correlation between plasma of the endocannabinoid 2-arachidonoyl glycerol (2-AG) and ghrelin during hedonic, but not nonhedonic, eating and the consumption of food for pleasure is characterized by increased peripheral levels of both peptides. And this two endogenous rewarding chemical signals influences food intake and, ultimately, body mass.

== See also ==
- Eating disorder
- Emotional eating
- Melanin-concentrating hormone
