= Emotional approach coping =

Concept in psychology

Emotional approach coping is a psychological construct that involves the use of emotional processing and emotional expression in response to a stressful situation. As opposed to emotional avoidance, in which emotions are experienced as a negative, undesired reaction to a stressful situation, emotional approach coping involves the conscious use of emotional expression and processing to better deal with a stressful situation. The construct was developed to explain an inconsistency in the stress and coping literature: emotion-focused coping was associated with largely maladaptive outcomes while emotional processing and expression was demonstrated to be beneficial.

== History of the construct ==
Coping is a conscious attempt to address and alleviate demands perceived as stressful. Research examining coping has suggested two broad categories of coping: emotion-focused and problem-focused coping. Emotion-focused coping involves attempts to regulate the negative emotional response to stress. Whereas problem-focused coping involves attempts to directly modify the stressor. Coping processes have also been defined instead on whether they involve approaching the stressful situation or avoiding it.

The experience of powerful emotions has been characterized by researchers as disruptive and dysfunctional, particularly for cognitive processes. Moreover, research also suggests links between emotion-focused coping and poor psychological outcomes. A review of over 100 studies found associations between emotion-focused coping and negative outcomes such as poor life satisfaction, greater depressive and anxious symptoms and neuroticism.

However, there is some evidence in the empirical literature that emotional expression can be functional and adaptive. Experimental research on expressive writing, involving emotional disclosure, has been shown to have benefits for performance on cognitive tasks and for psychological outcomes, such as depressive symptoms. Emotion regulation has also illustrated the importance of emotional processing and expression for well-being. Therapeutic approaches have also demonstrated the important role of emotions in coping with difficult situations. Emotion-focused therapy is a clinical psychology approach that emphasizes the importance of acknowledging and tolerating negative emotions and enjoying positive emotions for healthy psychological adjustment.

Researchers have attempted to disentangle the maladaptive and functional aspects of emotion-focused coping by examining the measurements of emotion-focused coping. Several studies have found that emotion-focused measurements of coping often aggregate approach and avoidance strategies. A second reason emotion-focused coping has been construed as maladaptive is that measures of emotion-focused coping are confounded with measures of distress. In an attempt to rectify these difficulties with the operationalization of emotion-focused coping, a new scale for assessing emotional approach coping was proposed.

In the context of natural disaster and crisis, mental health and supporting emotional coping styles has been found to be often be neglected by first responders. Research suggests that those experiencing crisis and trauma do better when they are able to engage with their emotional experiences by reflecting on them in order to make meaning of them. This process leads to an increase in tolerance of emotion, resilience, psychological flexibility, and community engagement. Furthermore, this process leads to greater growth when a collective approach to emotional processing is taken.

== Assessment of coping through emotional approach ==
Emotional approach coping can be assessed using the emotional approach coping scales developed by Stanton, Kirk, Cameron, and Danoff-Burg in 2000. The scales involve two distinct subscales of items: emotional processing and emotional expression. Emotional processing and emotional expression scales are positively correlated but distinct. The emotional processing items reflect an attempt to understand, consider and examine emotions in response to a stressful event. For example, "I acknowledge my feelings" and "I take time to figure out what I'm really feeling." Emotional expression items assess attempts to verbally and non-verbally communicate and share emotions. Sample items include: "I allow myself to express my feelings" and "I feel free to express my emotions." The emotional approach coping scales have been tested and validated using situational (i.e., what do you do in response to a specific stressor) and dispositional (i.e., what do you do in general) instruction sets. The scales are uncorrelated with social desirability. In addition to English, the emotional approach coping scale has also been validated in Norwegian and Turkish.

== Empirical support ==
=== Longitudinal research ===
==== Infertility ====
Among heterosexual couples coping with infertility, emotional approach coping predicted decreased depressive symptoms for both members of the couple after an unsuccessful insemination attempt. Emotional approach coping may also confer benefits for partners. Having a male partner high in emotional approach coping was protective against depressive symptoms for female partners low in emotional approach coping.

==== Sexual assault ====
Emotional approach coping may confer some benefits to victims of sexual assault. Among sexual assault survivors, increases in emotional expression were associated with greater perceived control over the recovery process and feelings of control were associated with decreased distress after the assault.

==== Breast cancer ====
There is mixed evidence for the utility of emotional approach coping in samples of women with breast cancer. In a longitudinal study of women with breast cancer, for women who perceived their social environments to be receptive, emotional expression predicted improved quality of life. Coping through emotional expression among women with breast cancer has also been found to predict an increase in post-traumatic growth. However, other studies have not found the same link between emotional expression and post-traumatic growth.

=== Cross-sectional research ===
==== Student and community samples ====
Cross-sectional studies illustrate the link between emotional approach coping and positive psychological adjustment, under certain conditions in student and community samples. In a cross-sectional study of undergraduate women, women who scored more highly on emotional approach coping reported more positive and less negative valenced repetitive thoughts. In a community sample of African-American adults, emotional approach coping has also been found to be negatively associated with anger, trait anxiety and depressive symptoms. In addition, women who reported higher dispositional emotional processing also reported fewer depressive and anxious symptoms and greater life satisfaction; while for men, higher dispositional emotional expression was linked to greater life satisfaction.

==== Clinical samples ====
There is some evidence to suggest associations between emotional approach coping and psychological well-being. In a study of individuals who met DSM-IV criteria for anxiety disorder and healthy controls, levels of emotional approach coping were lower in those individuals who met the criteria than in controls. Another study examined veterans and found that higher levels emotional expression (but not emotional processing) were associated with lower depressive symptoms and decreased post-traumatic stress disorder, even when statistically controlling for age, gender, and race.

==== Cancer samples ====
Cross-sectional research of cancer samples reveals some positive, negative and mixed links with emotional approach coping. Higher emotional processing and emotional expression in female cancer survivors was associated with higher positive emotions and lower negative emotions. In male cancer survivors, higher emotional processing has been linked to higher positive emotions and higher emotional expression has been linked with lower negative emotions and fewer intrusive thoughts. However, the links between emotional approach coping and psychological adjustment are not all positive some are negative or mixed. In one study of women who had received an abnormal result on an ovarian cancer screen, higher emotional processing was associated with higher intrusive thoughts and neither emotional processing nor emotional expression were associated with cancer-related post-traumatic growth.

==== Diabetes samples ====
There is from cross-sectional research that suggests the benefits of emotional processing for patients with diabetes. Among patients with type 2 diabetes, higher emotional processing was associated with greater diabetes-related knowledge, medication adherence and relevant self-care behaviors such as diet, physical activity and blood glucose monitoring. Similarly, in adolescent patients with Type 1 diabetes, emotional processing was revealed to be associated with better metabolic control.

== Factors that determine effectiveness ==
=== Stressor-coping strategy fit ===
The stressor and the individual's appraisal of the stressor may determine the effectiveness of emotional approach coping as a mechanism for managing stress. An appraisal of a stressful situation as uncontrollable may make emotional approach coping an advantageous coping mechanism. In fact, one study of undergraduates shows that when faced with a stressor individuals appraise as more uncontrollable, they are more likely to endorse using emotional approach coping to manage it.

=== Gender ===
There is some evidence to suggest that the utility of emotional approach coping varies by gender. In a longitudinal study, emotional approach coping was found to predict increased life satisfaction and decreased depressive symptoms over time in women; however, in men, emotional approach coping predicted poorer adjustment over time. Some samples have also found that women report using emotional processing and expression more than men. However, research of infertile couples found no differences in the utility of emotional approach coping for men and women.

=== Individual differences ===
Individual differences, such as skill at engaging active coping techniques and comfort with expressing emotions, may modify the tendency to successfully employ emotional approach coping. Individuals high in perceived emotional intelligence may also be more likely to use emotional approach coping skillfully. Holding unrealistic perceptions of control may make the use of coping through emotional approach less likely because expressing and processing emotions could lead to evaluations that result in acknowledgement of illusions of control. Personality attributes, such as hope, can also moderate the effectiveness of emotional approach coping. Women with breast cancer who were high in hope and reported coping with emotional expression, had fewer medical appointments for cancer-related complaints, enhanced physical health and decreased distress compared to women who did not cope using emotional expression.

== Mechanisms ==
=== Goal identification and pursuit ===
The effects of emotional approach coping could be the result of identifying goals, understanding barriers to achieving those goals, and finding new pathways to achieve them. Emotional expression and processing could help individuals direct attention to identify the most important goals in their lives.

=== Habituation to the stressor and cognitive appraisal ===
The effects of emotional approach coping could also be due to exposure to stressful stimuli when actively processing and expressing emotions. The repeated exposure to the stressor could result in physiological habituation. Repeated exposure to a stressor through emotional expression and processing could also lead to cognitive reappraisal of the stressor and related self-affirmations.

=== Affect labeling ===
The process of labeling the emotions (i.e., putting them into words) may lessen the intensity of the emotional experience. Studies have shown the process of affective labeling leads to decreases in brain regions such as the amygdala and increases in activation of the prefrontal cortex, possibly indicating beneficial emotion regulation.

=== Regulation of social environment ===
The use of emotional approach coping may signal to the social environment that an individual is in need of support. The responsiveness of the social environment will determine the adaptiveness of emotional approach coping. Emotional expression that is met with empathetic concern may lead to better adjustment than emotional expression met by rejection. Some evidence from the research suggests this could be a potential mechanism. For women with breast cancer who perceive their social environment to be highly receptive, coping through emotional expression predicts improved quality of life.

== See also ==
- Positive psychology
