= Dyscopia =

Dyscopia consists of the Latin root copia, which means abundance or plenty (see cornucopia), and the Greek prefix dys-, which means "bad", "abnormal", "difficult" or "impaired".

This word has assumed two meanings, both of which are essentially a play on words based on the phonic similarity of the words "copy" and "cope" with copia.

In the field of neurology, dyscopia is used to describe a type of developmental coordination disorder related to dyslexia and dysgraphia (inability to read or write). Specifically, it is taken to mean difficulty with coping. Sometimes a similar word, "acopia", is mistaken to mean the same, although this is not a medical term and has no basis in Latin.

The term "dyscopia" has also made its way into general medical parlance as a tongue-in-cheek shorthand notation for patients who, after being examined and found to have no specific medical condition, are deemed to be not coping with certain aspects of their lives, and are presumed to be seeking treatment as a form of comfort from the medical profession. More recently, and controversially, the term has been used in this context as a diagnosis for admission to hospital.

The words have also been used in medical notes as a cryptic indication that certain members of a seriously ill patient's family are not coping with the situation and should be afforded some extra consideration for their feelings when the case is being discussed.

== As dystranscribia ==
In neurology, the word "dyscopia" is used to describe a condition which is common as one of the sequelae of cerebral commisurotomy, a neurosurgical procedure in which the left and right hemispheres of the brain are separated by severing the corpus callosum. This procedure has been shown to reduce the frequency and severity of seizures in extreme cases of epilepsy.

An affected individual will exhibit difficulty with copying simple line drawings. This is often accompanied to lesser or greater degree by difficulty with writing and other fine motor skills.

== As 'not coping' in medical usage ==
Terms such as "social admission", "atypical presentation", and even the derogatory terms "bed blocker" or "crumblie" have been used in medical notes synonymously with dyscopia or acopia as a reason for hospital admission.

The use of the term has become sufficiently commonplace in medical notes that a recent publication of a psychiatric dictionary even cites it as an actual diagnosis.

Patients who are likely to be labelled with one of these terms are sometimes frail and elderly or people with long-term disabilities. Their failure to cope is often a result of inadequate social support coupled with a deterioration of functional capability which is not clearly linked to an obvious or specific medical or psychiatric pathology.

Sometimes, however, despite the fact that terms such as acopia and social admission can be considered tongue-in-cheek by those adhering to the strictest of medical and psychiatric terminology, they can frequently describe a range of "symptoms", such as extreme lability and emotionality when demands are not met and the unwillingness of a minority of patients that might be encountered in psychiatry, to function and make ends meet, despite the fact that such patients might be lucid and able-bodied.

A possible controversy associated with using dyscopia and acopia as diagnoses could arise when wrongfully applied to those who have genuine problems with mobility; genuine medical conditions may be overlooked. Investigation of symptoms is a legitimate reason for admission, and if medical staff are too swift to dismiss concerns by use of such informal labels, genuine symptoms may not be taken seriously and investigated. This may lead to treatable conditions being overlooked, and in turn, result in compromised quality of life and unnecessary suffering.

Dyscopia (and likewise acopia), in this context, is not generally used by the medical community for fear of insulting the patient and bringing the caregiver's professional standing into question.

== Colloquial usage ==
Acopia has been adopted as the name of a company based in Crawley, UK, presumably referring the correct Latin root of the word copia meaning abundance.

The words also appear to be gaining traction in common usage as colloquialisms meaning emotional lability over trivial events or circumstances. This may well assist in demystifying the term and discouraging its usage in medical circles.
