= Humor styles =

Distinct ways in which people use humor

Humor styles are a subject of research in the field of personality psychology that focuses on the ways in which individuals differ in their use of humor. People of all ages and cultures respond to humor, but their use of it can vary greatly. There are multiple factors, such as culture, age, and political orientation, that play a role in determining what people find humorous. Although humor styles can be somewhat variable depending on social context, they tend to be a relatively stable personality characteristic among individuals. Humor can play an instrumental role in the formation of social bonds, enabling people to relate to peers or to attract a mate, and can help to release tension during periods of stress. There is a lack of current, reliable research that explores the impact of humor usages on others because it is difficult to distinguish a healthy humor usage from one that is unhealthy. Justifications for harmful versus benign humor styles are subjective and lead to varying definitions of either usage.

The Humor Styles Questionnaire (HSQ) has emerged as a different model for understanding the individual differences in humor styles. Humor can enhance individuals' self representation, and can also help to facilitate positive interactions with others. Humor can be both beneficial and detrimental to social relationships. The combination of these factors creates four distinct humor styles: self-enhancing, affiliative, aggressive, and self-defeating. Some styles of humor promote health and well-being, while other styles have the potential to negatively impact both mental and physical health. There are other humor scale surveys that are used to measure different aspects of humor, such as The Situational Humor Response Questionnaire, The Coping Humor Scale, The Sense of Humor Questionnaire, and The Multidimensional Sense of Humor Scale.

== The Sense of Humor Questionnaire ==
The Sense of Humor Questionnaire was proposed by Sven Svenbaks in 1974. The original Sense of Humor Questionnaire was 22 items broken into three categories that could be answered on a scale of 1-4. The three categories are: M-items (reactive to humor and implicit messages), L-items (attitude towards humorous people and situations), E-items (openness to expression of amusement). An example of each type of item is: when I go to the movies I prefer to know ahead what type of story it is (M-item), fun is aimed at hurting another (L-item), do you ever laugh so hard it hurts? (E-item). M-items and L-items use the same scale prompts, 1 = total agreement, 4 = total disagreement, whereas E-items use 1 = very seldom, 4 = very often. However, some of the items could overlap and fit into another group of items. Despite the dimensionality problem, the scores correlated moderately positively to each other (r = .29 to .38). The Sense of Humor Questionnaire was revised and included items on each sub-scale that evaluate more in-depth of each group. The revised version of the Sense of Humor Questionnaire M and L-items have strong internal consistency (.60's and .70's) but E-items have poor internal consistency. Due to poor internal consistency, E-items were not used in further studies, but M-items were used for the Situation Humor Response and L-items were used for the Humor Coping Scale.

== The Coping Humor Scale ==
The Coping Humor Scale was created by Rod A. Martin, Fazal Mittu and Herbert M. Lefcourt in 1983. The Coping Humor Scale is a survey of 7 items that assesses how much participants use humor to cope with stress. The responses on the survey are on a 1-4 scale, strongly disagree (1) to strongly agree (4). The alphas range from .60 to .70 and the test-retest reliability of 12 weeks alpha is .80. While the Coping Humor Scale doesn't have as high of an internal consistency as the Situational Humor Response Questionnaire, it is unique in the "self-observer agreement." The way participants rate themselves is strongly correlated with how their friends rate them on similar content.

== The Situational Humor Response Questionnaire ==
The Situational Humor Response Questionnaire was created by Martin and Lefcourt in 1984. It is based on Eysenck's definition of humor and is a survey composed of 18 different situations that are on a scale from everyday events to events that are anxiety inducing and 3 non-situational items. The three non-situational items are: how desirable it is to the participant to have friends that are easily amused, how much a participants' humor changes depending on the situation, and a self-rating question about how likely the participant is to laugh in different situations. In regard to the Situational Humor Response Questionnaire, humor is defined as how often and individual smiles, laughs, or shows amusement but ignores the type of humor used. The responses to the survey are on a 1-5 scale, I would not have been particularly amused (1) to I would have laughed heartily (5). The Situational Humor Response Questionnaire was tested on almost 500 participants in four groups and has alpha coefficients from .70 to .83. Of the participants, 33 were tested again a month later to examine the test-retest reliability which has an alpha of 0.70. The Situational Humor Response Questionnaire was compared to the Crowne-Marlowe (1960) Social Desirability Scale but had only .04 correlation meaning the Situational Humor Response Questionnaire is free from the bias of social desirability.

== The Multidimensional Sense of Humor Scale ==
The Multidimensional Sense of Humor Scale was created by James A. Thorson and F. C. Powell in 1991 and combines elements from the Situational Humor Response Questionnaire, the Coping Humor Scale, and the Sense of Humor Questionnaire. It was created to assess the different elements of sense humor such as playfulness, humorous ability, recognition and appreciation of humor, and using humor to achieve social goals or as a coping mechanism. The Multidimensional Sense of Humor Scale is composed of 124 statements with responses on a scale of 1-5. 1 = strongly disagree, 5 = strongly agree. The 124 statements were reduced to 29 with an alpha reliability of .92. The remaining statements are broken into four factors. Factor 1 combines humor production humor for social uses, Factor 2 combines coping humor and adaptive humor, Factor 3 evaluates humor appreciation, and Factor 4 evaluates the participant's attitude on humor. Some examples of statements on the Multidimensional Sense of Humor Scale respective to the factors are: I use humor to entertain my friends, uses of humor help me master difficult situations, I like a good joke, and people who tell jokes are a pain in the neck.

== The Humor Styles Questionnaire (HSQ) ==
The Humor Styles Questionnaire (HSQ) was developed by Rod Martin and Patricia Doris (2003) to measure individual differences in styles of humor. Humor has been shown to be a personality characteristic that remains relatively stable over time. Humor is sometimes viewed as a one-dimensional trait. However, individuals seem to differ in the ways in which they use humor in their everyday lives, and different styles of humor seem to have different outcomes. As a result, two variables are measured within the questionnaire to cover multiple dimensions that humor contain. The Humor Styles Questionnaire was developed to identify the ways in which individuals differ in humor styles and how these differences influence health, well-being, relationships, and other outcomes.

The Humor Styles Questionnaire is a 32-item self-report inventory used to identify how individuals use humor in their lives. Participants respond to the degree to which they agree with each statement (e.g., "I enjoy making people laugh") on a scale from 1 (totally disagree) to 7 (totally agree). The questionnaire measures two main factors in humor. The first factor measures whether humor is used to enhance the self or enhance one's relationships with others. The second factor measures whether the humor is relatively benevolent or potentially detrimental and destructive. The combination of these factors creates four distinct humor styles: affiliative, self-enhancing, aggressive, and self-defeating.

The reliability of the Humor Style Questionnaire is questionable. The original questionnaire was written in German and due to inexact translations and cultural differences, when translated to another language it frequently generates test items that don't produce anticipated results. When the HSQ is given in the original language, the test for internal consistencies was an alpha over 0.77 for all items. However, when translated, the internal consistency alpha varied from .55 (aggressive) to .89 (self-enhancing) in one study, Taher et al. (2008), and from .67 (self-defeating) to .78 (self-enhancing) in another study, Bilge and Saltuk (2007). While most of the styles tested reasonably well, the aggressive humor scale produced the lowest internal consistency values.

=== Affiliative humor ===
Affiliative humor is defined as the style of humor used to enhance one's relationships with others in a benevolent, positive manner. This style of humor is typically used in a benevolent, self-accepting way. Individuals high in this dimension often use humor as a way to charm and amuse others, ease tension among others, and improve relationships. They are often spontaneous in their joke telling, frequently participate in witty banter, and enjoy laughing with others. Affiliative humor is similar to self-defeating humor because both styles of humor enhance the relationships with others. However, unlike self-defeating humor, affiliative humor is not used at one's own expense.

A number of outcomes are associated with the use of affiliative humor. Individuals who report high levels of affiliative humor are more likely to initiate friendships and less likely to become victims of bullying. In an organizational setting, affiliative humor has been shown to increase group cohesiveness and promote creativity in the workplace. Affiliative humor is also associated with increased levels of (explicit) self-esteem, psychological well-being, emotional stability, and social intimacy. They are also more likely to exhibit higher levels of implicit self-esteem (independently of their level of explicit self-esteem).

This style of humor is associated with decreased levels of depressive symptoms and anxiety. Individuals who use affiliative humor tend to have higher levels of extraversion and openness to experience as personality characteristics.

Examples of items targeting affiliative humor on the HSQ include:

- I don't often joke around with my friends. (reversed)
- I rarely make other people laugh by telling funny stories about myself. (reversed)

=== Self-enhancing humor ===
Self-enhancing humor is a style of humor related to having a good-natured attitude toward life, having the ability to laugh at yourself, your circumstances and the idiosyncrasies of life in constructive, non-detrimental manner. It is used by individuals to enhance the self in a benevolent, positive manner. This type of humor is best understood as a type of coping or emotion-regulating humor in which individuals use humor to look on the bright side of a bad situation, find the silver lining or maintain a positive attitude even in trying times.

Self-enhancing humor is associated with a number of personality variables as well as psychological, physical and health-related outcomes. Individuals who engage more in the self-enhancing humor style are less likely to exhibit depressive symptoms. In an organizational setting, self-enhancing humor has been shown to promote creativity and reduce stress in the workplace. The self-enhancing style of humor has also been shown to be related to increased levels of self-esteem, optimism, and psychological well-being, as well as decreased levels of depression and anxiety. Individuals who use the self-enhancing humor style are more likely to exhibit extraversion and openness to experience as personality characteristics and less likely to exhibit neuroticism.

Examples of self-enhancing humor on the HSQ include:

- If I am feeling upset or unhappy I usually try to think of something funny about the situation to make myself feel better.
- Even when I'm by myself, I'm often amused by the absurdities of life.

=== Aggressive humor ===
Aggressive humor is a style of humor that is potentially detrimental towards others. This type of humor is characterized by the use of sarcasm, put-downs, teasing, criticism, ridicule, and other types of humor used at the expense of others. Aggressive humor often disregards the impact it might have on others. Prejudices such as racism and sexism are considered to be the aggressive style of humor. This type of humor may at times seem like playful fun, but sometimes the underlying intent is to harm or belittle others. Aggressive humor is related to higher levels of neuroticism and lower levels of agreeableness and conscientiousness.

Individuals who exhibit higher levels of aggressive humor tend to score higher on measures of hostility and general aggression. Males tend to use aggressive humor more often than females.

Examples of aggressive humor on the HSQ might include:

- When telling jokes or saying funny things, I am usually not very concerned about how other people are taking it.
- People are never offended or hurt by my sense of humor. (reversed)
- If you think people are laughing at you, they probably are.

=== Self-defeating humor ===
Self-defeating humor is the style of humor characterized by the use of potentially detrimental humor towards the self in order to gain approval from others. Individuals high in this dimension engage in self-disparaging humor in which laughter is often at their own expense. Self-defeating humor often comes in the form of pleasing others by being the "butt" of the joke. This style of humor is sometimes seen as a form of denial in which humor is used as a defense mechanism for hiding negative feelings about the self.

A variety of variables are associated with self-defeating humor. Individuals who more frequently use self-defeating humor show increased depressive symptoms. Individuals who use this style of humor tend to have higher levels of neuroticism and lower levels of agreeableness and conscientiousness. Self-defeating humor is associated with higher levels of depression, anxiety and psychiatric symptoms. It is also associated with lower levels of self-esteem, psychological well-being and intimacy and higher levels of bullying victimization.

Examples of self-defeating items on the Humor Styles Questionnaire might include:

- I often try to make people like or accept me more by saying something funny about my own weaknesses, blunders, or faults.
- If I am having problems or feeling unhappy, I often cover it up by joking around, so that even my closest friends don't know how I really feel.
