= Street-level bureaucracy =

Individuals who implement laws and public policies

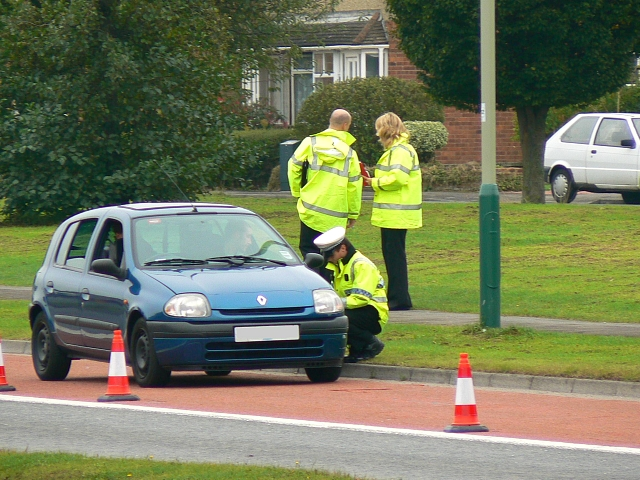
Police officers stop a motorist and check the motorist's documents at a random checkpoint.

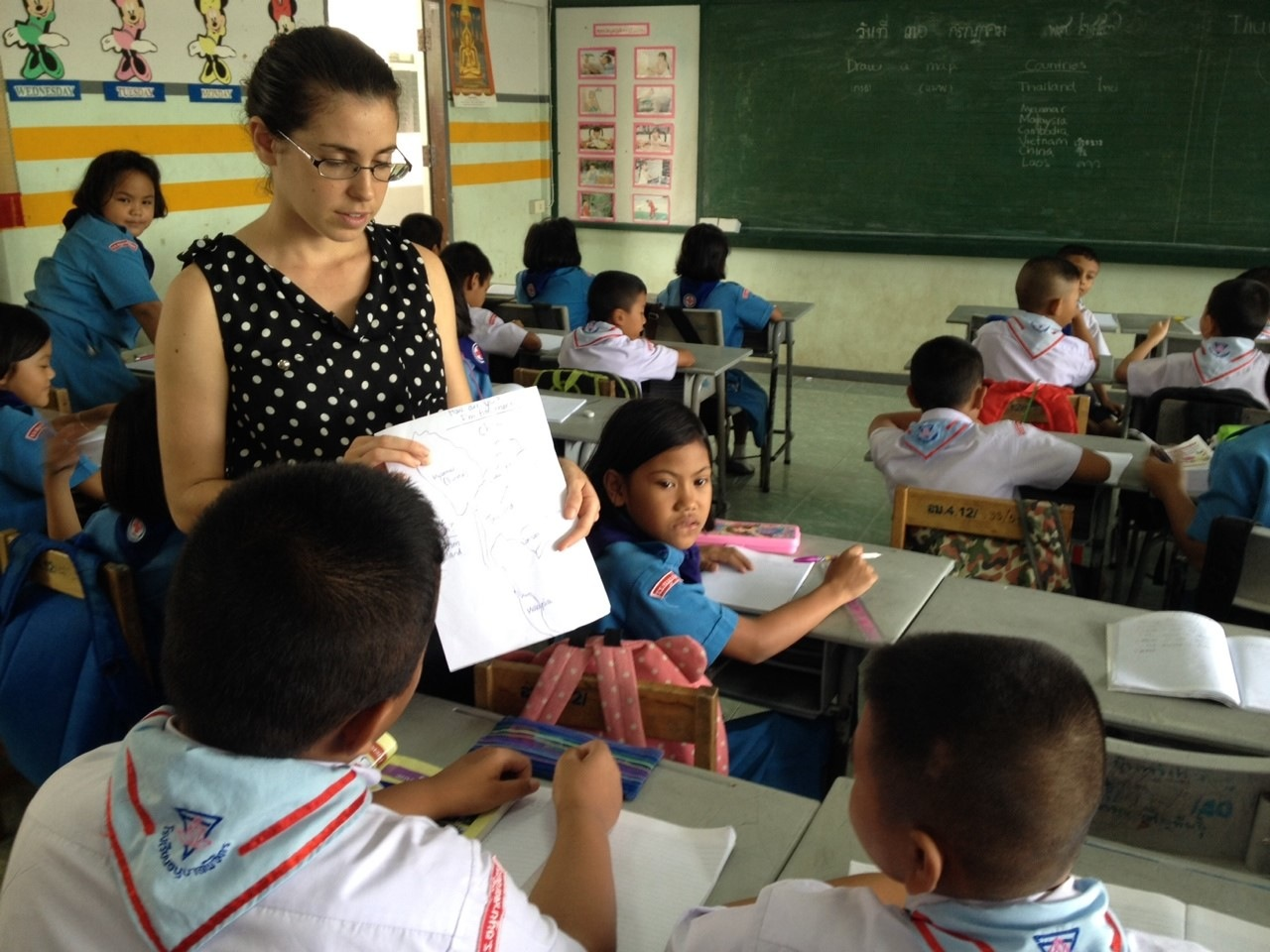
An elementary school teacher instructing her students.

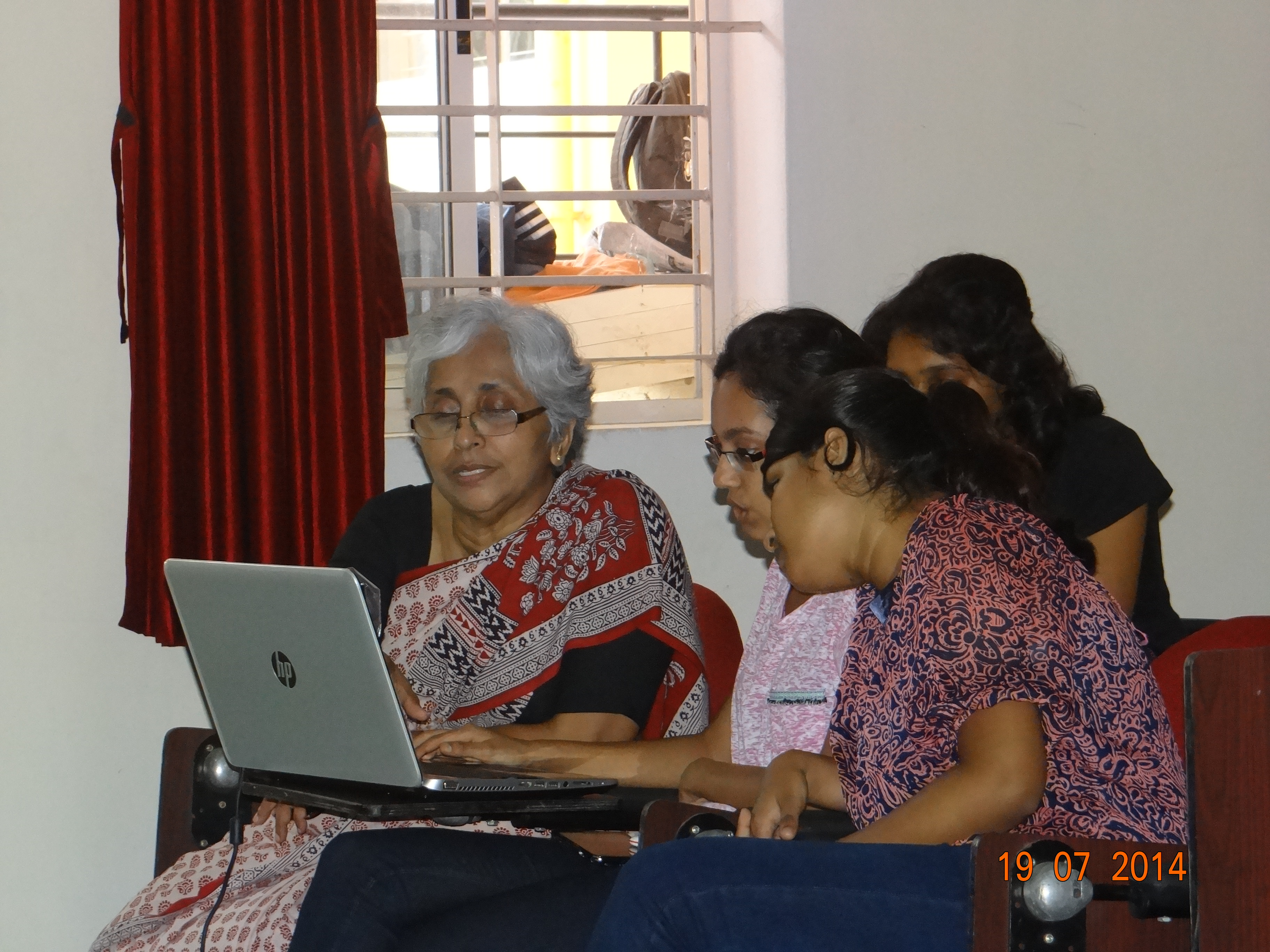
A social worker in India teaches her clients how to use a laptop.

Street-level bureaucracy is the subset of a public agency or government institution where the civil servants have direct contact with members of the general public. Street-level civil servants carry out and/or enforce the actions required by a government's laws and public policies, in areas ranging from safety and security to education and social services. A few examples include police officers, border guards, social workers and public school teachers. These civil servants have direct contact with members of the general public, in contrast with civil servants who do policy analysis or economic analysis, who do not meet the public. Street-level bureaucrats act as liaisons between government policy-makers and citizens and these civil servants implement policy decisions made by senior officials in the public service and/or by elected officials.

Street-level bureaucrats interact and communicate with the general public, either in person (as with a police officer doing a random checkpoint to check for drunk driving or a civil servant in a department of transportation who helps people to register a newly purchased car and provide them with licence plates); over the phone (as with a government call center, where civil servants answer phone calls from people who are applying for or receiving unemployment insurance); or, in jurisdictions which have implemented electronic government technologies, via the Internet (e.g., a person finding out about the government's taxation laws by going onto the taxation department's official website and asking questions to a civil servant via email).

Street-level bureaucrats often have some degree of discretion on how they enforce the rules, laws and policies which they are assigned to uphold. For example, a police officer who catches a speeding motorist typically can decide whether to give the driver a warning or apply a penalty such as a fine or criminal charge; a border guard who finds undeclared rum in a border-crossing motorist's car trunk can either give the person a warning, confiscate and destroy the contraband item, or levy a fine or other penalty; a government social worker who meets with an unemployed person can decide whether or not to provide social assistance or unemployment insurance benefits; and a high school principal who finds that a student is skipping school can decide whether or not to suspend the person, taking into account the student's unique circumstances and situation. Even though front-line bureaucrats have this degree of discretion, they typically must operate within the rule of law, the system of government regulations, laws and administrative procedural rules. These regulations, laws and rules help to ensure that the street-level bureaucracy operates fairly and ethically, and that each citizen is treated fairly.

== History ==
The concept of street-level bureaucracy was first coined by Michael Lipsky in 1969, who argued that "policy implementation in the end comes down to the people [(the street-level bureaucrats)] who actually implement it". However, the process of street-level bureaucracy has been around for a much longer period. A "government will be better accepted if its administrators [e.g., bureaucrats] reflect the origins [and needs] of its people", an ideal which embodies the goals of an effective street-level bureaucracy in America. Some of the first street-level bureaucrats in the US were post office officials and administrators. The presidency of Woodrow Wilson helped to spur a large growth in public administration and government policy-making, which in turn led to larger-sized and better-funded street-level bureaucracies. However it was not until the 1950s with the baby boom that street level bureaucracy became as strong as a presence in society as it is today.

Lipsky describes street level bureaucrats as the "human face" of policy, since these individuals interact directly with citizens. The history of street-level bureaucracy follows the history of policy development and the scope of government in America, with areas with larger populations and more government policies employing more public servants (e.g., Chicago which employs 26,680 teachers). Due to street-level bureaucrats' close interactions with citizens, day-to-day application of discretion in their assessment of people's cases and issues, and their role as policy interpreters, Lipsky claims that "in a sense the street-level bureaucrats implicitly mediate aspects of the constitutional relationship of citizens to the state. In short, they hold the keys to a dimension of citizenship." The interpretation of the duties, scope, and responsibilities of street-level bureaucrats are still debated in the 2000s, with ongoing discussion on the roles of discretion, accountability, lack of resources, and technology and concerns raised about the risks of corruption.

== Demand and need ==
Where there is population growth, there is usually growth in demand for these occupations, because there are more citizens who need public services. The demand for these occupations will vary by region but generally, the job outlook in these careers is on the rise in many countries and/or regions where there is an increase in population.

=== Education ===
In the United States' education sector there is a strong demand for teachers in numerous regions across the country. There are currently fifty-one "hot spots" with a demand for educators in these regions. Amongst these fifty-one hot spots, five of the regions are with an incredible need for educators in both the primary and secondary education sector. The areas of desperate need include: Las Vegas, Nevada; the Northern region of Oklahoma; Kansas City, Missouri; the Central region of Arkansas; and the Western region of Mississippi.

=== Police ===
The demand for police officers is another occupation that will experience growth over the next ten years. Because urbanized and metropolitan regions are amongst the fastest growing in the United States, that is generally where the demand for these individuals will be.

=== Firefighters ===
Firefighters are another case in protective services where an increase in demand is expected over the next decade. A seven percent increase in career outlook is to be expected by the year 2022.

=== Social workers ===
The demand for social workers has an average growth rate in the United States. With a general population increase social workers are needed in all areas of the career field. The demand for social workers is extremely high. The national average for growth in all careers stands at eleven percent, while a projected nineteen percent increase in social work is needed to fulfill the sectors responsibility to the general public.

Street-level bureaucrat	Number of employees—2012	Projected work force—2022	Percentage growth
Police	780,000	821,000	5%
Firefighters	307,000	372,300	7%
Teachers	1,361,200	1,529,100	12%
Social workers	607,000	721,500	19%

== Problems ==
=== Corruption and accountability ===
Corruption in street-level bureaucracy is a violation of the ethical codes of conduct, laws and regulations that have been established by the government and its agencies. An example of corruption would be cases where a police officer or border guard accepted a bribe from a member of the public in return for not enforcing a law or regulation. There are many agencies which define and interpret what is acceptable ethical behavior and what is not. Violation of these rules or ethical codes of conduct by street-level bureaucrats has repercussions that effect not only the person or agency involved, but also the general public that these street-level bureaucracies serve. Neutrality and impartiality in following policies and procedures is what is expected and most remain separate from person feelings or views. Here is a link to a social work case that let personal feelings override their ethical responsibility.

Another example for corruption in street-level bureaucracy are black market payments for doctors and nurses, as part of the shadow economy. The term "black market medicine" refers to a variety of illegal actions that individuals take in order to obtain healthcare services for themselves. Such actions include direct payments to doctors in government hospitals to improve one's position on the waiting list (especially for surgeries) or payments to doctors so they will treat the patient personally.

According to Lipsky, many of these street-level bureaucrats will "often spend their work lives in these corrupted world of service... doing the best they can in adverse circumstances" This can highlight the inherent problems associated with the public policy-making process.

Accountability is the means by which these codes are upheld and to ensure moral and ethical practices within these bureaucratic agencies. There is much debate over the methodology of how exactly these agencies should be held accountable. Accountability is divided into five categories: transparency, liability, controllability, responsibility, and responsiveness.

Two major accountability processes are compliance based and performance based. "Traditionally, accountability has involved defining rules and procedures and then employing various means to ensure compliance with these expectations" Performance-based practices rely on standardized processes that measure performance in terms of output and results. Yet compliance based, and performance based accountability has limitations for measuring the efficiency, effectiveness, equity, and economy of the bureaucracy. Furthermore, accountability stems from a multidimensional perspective, which includes the general public the bureaucracy serves, peers and co-workers, office managers, public administrators, and elected officials.

=== Discretion ===
Discretion can be defined as a component in the decision making process that determines an individual's action or non-action. Carrington divides discretion into two major components as the freedom the decision maker has to choose between different actions; and the decision to act or not act through the rules and judgment of the decision maker. Michael Lipsky states street level bureaucrats have discretion because human judgment is in the nature of service work that machines could not replace. Street level bureaucrats are responsible for making appropriate decisions that are appropriate for clients and their situations. Lipsky states all street level bureaucrats will confront situations in which they need to depart from service ideals in order to cope with both expectations from their jobs and the public ideals.

According to Lipsky, the exercise of discretion among street level bureaucrats is critical in how public servants interact with citizens on a daily basis. He claims to understand these acts of discretion once must analyze the outcome of agency performance the public experiences as a combined result of agency rules and street level bureaucrats responses to unsanctioned work. Lipsky said the use of discretion by street level bureaucrats can’t be removed from everyday practice due to the complexity and uncertainty of human service work. Carrington identifies the fear of power abuse as a major reason for the opposition of discretion in the arena of street level bureaucrats and its citizens. In order to control problems in discretionary action there has been a demand for control by understanding the social situations in which discretion varies. Marissa Kelly also examines the use of discretion among street level bureaucrats to assert that discretion can either enhance or inhibit street level bureaucrats’ implementation of justice. She asserts that whether discretion is appropriate or not justice theories need to be further examined.

=== Lack of resources ===
Lipsky concludes that the lack of resources causes street level bureaucrat to develop simplified routines for processing cases that influence their everyday tasks. These routines for decisionmaking affect public policy. He states that street level bureaucrats are taught implementation skills instead of learning about how to find more resources, knowledge and information that would help them to implement policies more effectively. Hill identifies several implementation resources street level bureaucrats often lack such as; research resources, appropriate resources on how to shape specific policies for their specific situation, and access to expertise and skills training to better their decision-making and awareness in specific challenging situations that arise at the street level. Another key resource that front-line bureaucrats often lack is time to fully assess individual cases. In social services, social workers often have such a large caseload that they can only see social assistance recipients or applicants for a very short time each week. As a result, social workers have to make very rapid decisions as to whether to approve or deny welfare benefits.

== Role of technology ==
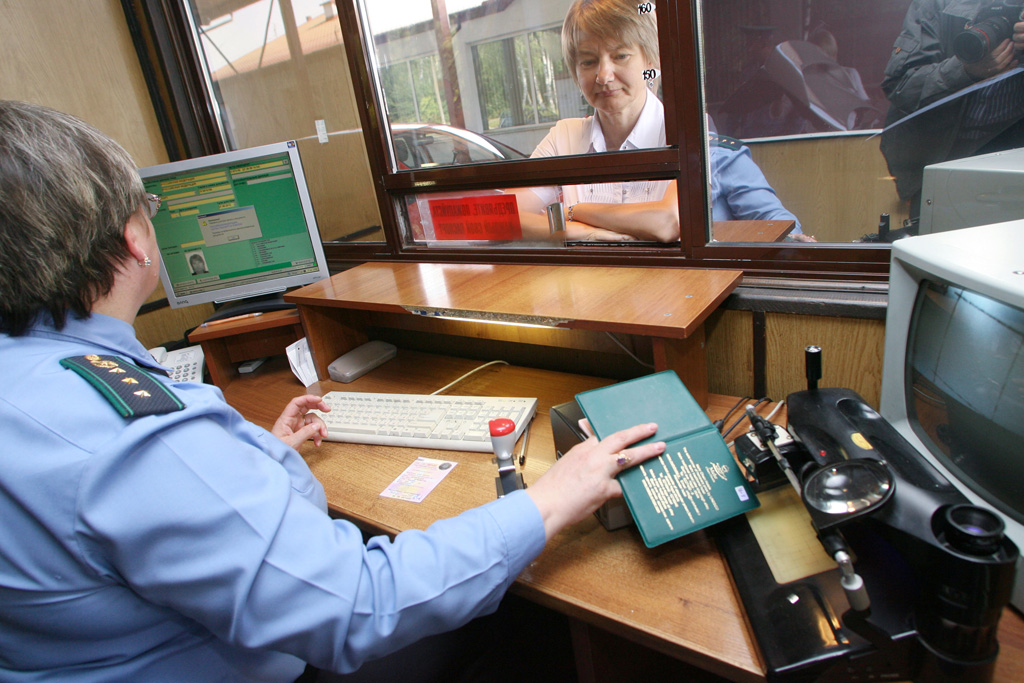
A border guard checks a computer display when a citizen comes to the service window.

Technological advances such as the widespread availability of the Internet and online databases have had a major impact on street-level bureaucracy and the front-line civil servants who provide services to citizens. There are two major theories on how technology has impacted this sector: curtailment theory and enablement theory. Curtailment theory holds that increasing technological advances hinder street-level bureaucrats and their ability to perform effectively; especially concerning their ability to exercise discretion on complex cases. Enablement theory holds that increasing technological advances, at best, empower the existing abilities of the street-level bureaucrat and better inform the citizen. At worst, the effects of technology are ambiguous.

=== Curtailment theory ===
It was first argued by Snellen that increasing technological advances (ITA) "deeply challeng[e] [the street-level bureaucrat's] ability to manipulate information." Snellen believed it was the ability to manipulate information that gave the SLB's their power. He further argued that as more decisions are made by computers or software, SLB's will lose their discretionary powers and they will shift to other actors. For example, in the 2010, some government organizations use online application forms for programs in which the computer program, rather than a human front-line bureaucrat, will reject applications which are incomplete. In a pre-technological advances era, a front-line bureaucrat might have used his or her discretion over decisions to allow an application in which some of the information requests are not completed (e.g., due to urgent need on the part of the citizen or the existence of an emergency situation). For example, in the 1960s and 1970s, if a social worker received a hand-written, pen-and-paper application from a homeless person for social assistance, the bureaucrat might approve the application even if the applicant did not have a street address or the required identification documents, to ensure that the applicant remained housed and safe.

However, there are four problems with this thesis. First, it is implied, but never proven, that with the arrival of more technology, discretion at the frontline will diminish or become non-existent. Second, Snellen's definition of the SLB's source of power is too narrow and does not take into account other sources of discretion. Third, this thesis only pertains to particular public organizations and does not apply to more common types of street-level bureaucracies such as police departments, schools, or social welfare departments. Lastly, this theory does not take into account how SLB's and other caseworkers actually utilize this new technology and how that might affect their performance.

=== Enablement theory ===
In contrast to the curtailment theory, a 2007 study by Jorna and Wagenaar showed that ITA was able to increase the amount of work done while cutting down on inconsistencies. However, the meaning and content of this work was not able to be captured and understood by ITA. A 2004 study by Vitalis and Duhaut highlighted the ambiguous nature of ITA. It was shown that the Internet or other forms of technology were utilized for simpler tasks, and more elaborate and complex matters were dealt with face-to-face with citizens. Vitalis and Duhaut come to the conclusion that a SLB has their discretionary power enhanced by ITA, and citizens benefit from ITA by being better informed of their rights when dealing with SLBs and their institutions. This theory maintains that discretion by the SLB is not hindered in any way by ITA and will continue to do their jobs effectively. This theory also focuses more on how ITA is utilized by both citizens and state agents which puts more emphasis on the ability of ITA to further help and empower SLBs and citizens.
