= Supportive communication =

Support in distressing times

Supportive communication is the support given, both verbal and nonverbal, in times of stress, heartbreak, physical and emotional distress, and other life stages that cause distress. The intention of this support is to assist those seen as being in need of such support. For example, individuals could be struggling with anger, frustration, hurt, and also physical distress, and Supportive Communication becomes a strategy utilized to help individuals cope with those feelings and experiences. At times, individuals do not like facing things alone, so they will seek Supportive Communication from family, friends, and other trusted sources. At other times, individuals such as family and friends will offer Supportive Communication to someone they feel is in need of such support. The impact of Supportive Communication has varied in research studies partially due to the reception of the communication. An individual may not receive the support in the intended way, or it may dredge up previous stress emotions and intensify them. The field of social support is still relatively new with the typologies below being discussed as recent as the mid to late 1970s.

== Background ==
The research on the topic of supportive communication, or variations thereof, have fairly recent beginnings with most of the heavy research beginning in the mid to late 1970s. Early research recognized the role of communication in helping others specifically as a role of social support, which also garnered quite a bit of attention in this time period. As a form of social support, scholars found that, unlike the sociological and psychological perspectives of social support, the supportive communication aspect served a specific role in actual communication of support unlike the psychological perspective which is the perceived belief of support or the sociological perspective which is considered more of the role of social integration.

Research in Supportive Communication has utilized a typology of supportive behaviors created in the 1970s and 80's which includes emotional, esteem, network support, informational, and tangible. Through these typologies, researchers have been able to better study the impact of each of the support types.

== Types ==
=== Nurturant support ===
==== Emotional ====
This type of supportive communication would be utilized to help those who are experiencing emotional distress. This emotional distress could be due to many environmental factors, some are listed above, but are all emotional stressors. The goal would be to help alleviate the pain on an emotional level, but cannot help necessarily on a physical level.

==== Esteem ====
The esteem type of supportive communication, in contrast to emotional supportive communication, would encourage the individual in need of support on a different level. This type of support would enhance the individuals feelings towards themselves. The support would highlight the individuals accomplishments, abilities, and/or their attributes in an effort to provide support when the supporter recognizes the need of social support.

==== Network ====
Network support is a type of support that gives the individual a sense of belonging among a group of individuals who may have experienced the same stressors that the individual is currently going through. This can be found by creating a group of individuals the person already knows, or joining a support group specifically categorized by the type of support the individual needs.

=== Action-facilitating support ===
==== Informational ====
On the other end of the spectrum from emotional or esteem, informational support is focused more on practical application of the support that is given. The practical applicability of this type of support can range from advice on what to do to feedback on what should not have been done. This type of support is also known as an action-facilitating support type which has the main goal of helping to solve the problem that is causing the stress.

==== Tangible ====
This type of support, much like the informational support, is considered an action-facilitating support type. The difference in tangible and informational is the action of assisting instead of just the advice, or verbal support. Tangible support would seek to provide money, housing, transportation, or other such services to help alleviate stressors in the individuals life.

== Supportive communication in business ==
Supportive communication helps employees to communicate accurately and honestly without jeopardizing interpersonal relationships. Supportive communication aims to preserve the relationship employees have even if management or other employees have to correct or point out a mistake in someone's actions.

== Social media ==
Social media has created a platform not only for sharing information, but also for individuals to seek Supportive Communication. Positive affirmation and communication in Social Media platforms have been linked in positive psychological benefits, reinforcing the idea of Supportive Communication helping in an emotional state. Social Media has also created for individuals the idea of social capital where individuals believe they have created a network that they can rely on when support is needed. Looking at the definition above for Social support, we can see how social media can potentially provide emotional, informational, esteem, and even network support.

With the open source structure of social media, a world of communication is opened for both positive and negative reinforcement. Bullying has become a prevalent concern when discussions occur regarding social media. Cyber bullying can occur because of race, sexual orientation, age, and political preference, among other attributes. Bullied individuals, specifically, can experience real life impact outside the digital world. This experience, without the Supportive Communication of their network, can lead to stress, anxiety, and other social factors impacting their daily lives. Emotional, informational, esteem, and network supportive communication can be an especially beneficial to the individuals experiencing the bullying as they receive the communication they are valued and cared for.

== See also ==
- Supportive psychotherapy
