= Michael Lipsky =

American political scientist (born 1940)

Michael Lipsky (born April 13, 1940) is a retired political scientist (University of Wisconsin, M.I.T.), and a former program officer at the Ford Foundation (1991-2003). From 2003 to 2018 he worked at Demos, the New York-based public policy organization. In 1998, Lipsky was elected as a fellow of the National Academy of Public Administration.

He is well known in the field of public administration for his classic book about street-level bureaucracy.

== Street-level bureaucracy ==
The concept of street-level bureaucracy was popularized by Michael Lipsky in 1980. He argued that "policy implementation in the end comes down to the people who actually implement it". He argued that state employees such as police and social workers should be seen as part of the "policy-making community" and as exercisers of political power.

Lipsky identified several problems with street-level bureaucracy, including "the problem of limited resources, the continuous negotiation that is necessary in order to make it seem like one is meeting targets, and the relations with (nonvoluntary) clients". However, some commentators have challenged Lipsky's model. Tony Evans and John Harris argue that "the proliferation of rules and regulations should not automatically be equated with greater control over professional discretion; paradoxically, more rules may create more discretion." But agree with Lipsky. They also argue that the exercise of professional discretion by street-level bureaucrats is not inherently "bad", but can be seen as an important professional attribute.

== Selected works ==
- 1970: Protest in City Politics: Rent Strikes, Housing and the Urban Poor (Rand McNally)
- 1977: Commission Politics: The Processing of Racial Crisis in America (with David J. Olson) (Transaction Books)
- 1980: Street-Level Bureaucracy: Dilemmas of the Individual in Public Services (Russell Sage Foundation)
- 1993: Nonprofits for Hire: The Welfare State in the Age of Contracting (with Steven R. Smith) (Harvard University Press)
- 2010: Street-Level Bureaucracy: Dilemmas of the Individual in Public Services, 30th Anniversary Expanded Edition (Russell Sage Foundation)
