= Avoidance coping =

Effort to avoid dealing with a stressor

In psychology, avoidance coping is a coping mechanism and form of experiential avoidance. It is characterized by a person's efforts, conscious or unconscious, to avoid dealing with a stressor in order to protect oneself from the difficulties the stressor presents. Avoidance coping can lead to substance abuse, social withdrawal, and other forms of escapism. High levels of avoidance behaviors may lead to a diagnosis of avoidant personality disorder, though not everyone who displays such behaviors meets the definition of having this disorder. Avoidance coping is also a symptom of post-traumatic stress disorder and related to symptoms of depression and anxiety. Additionally, avoidance coping is part of the approach-avoidance conflict theory introduced by psychologist Kurt Lewin.

Literature on coping often classifies coping strategies into two broad categories: approach/active coping and avoidance/passive coping. Approach coping includes behaviors that attempt to reduce stress by alleviating the problem directly, and avoidance coping includes behaviors that reduce stress by distancing oneself from the problem. Traditionally, approach coping has been seen as the healthiest and most beneficial way to reduce stress, while avoidance coping has been associated with negative personality traits, potentially harmful activities, and generally poorer outcomes. However, avoidance coping can reduce stress when nothing can be done to address the stressor.

== Measurement ==
Avoidance coping is measured via a self-reported questionnaire. Initially, the Multidimensional Experiential Avoidance Questionnaire (MEAQ) was used, which is a 62-item questionnaire that assesses experiential avoidance, and thus avoidance coping, by measuring how many avoidant behaviors a person exhibits and how strongly they agree with each statement on a scale of 1–6. Today, the Brief Experiential Avoidance Questionnaire (BEAQ) is used instead, containing 15 of the original 62 items from the MEAQ. In research, avoidance coping can be objectively quantified using immersive virtual reality.

== Treatment ==
Cognitive behavioral and psychoanalytic therapy are used to help those coping by avoidance to acknowledge, comprehend, and express their emotions. Acceptance and commitment therapy, a behavioral therapy that focuses on breaking down avoidance coping and showing it to be an unhealthy method for dealing with traumatic experiences, is also sometimes used.

Both active-cognitive and active-behavioral coping are used as replacement techniques for avoidance coping. Active-cognitive coping includes changing one's attitude towards a stressful event and looking for any positive impacts. Active-behavioral coping refers taking positive actions after finding out more about the situation.

== See also ==
- Coping (psychology)
- Mindfulness meditation
- Post-traumatic stress disorder
- Avoidant personality disorder
- Procrastination
- Stress management
- Video game addiction
