= Affect labeling =

Implicit emotional regulation strategy

Affect labeling is an implicit emotional regulation strategy that can be simply described as "putting feelings into words". Specifically, it refers to the idea that explicitly labeling one's, typically negative, emotional state results in a reduction of the conscious experience, physiological response, and/or behavior resulting from that emotional state. For example, writing about a negative experience in one's journal may improve one's mood. Some other examples of affect labeling include discussing one's feelings with a therapist, complaining to friends about a negative experience, posting one's feelings on social media or acknowledging the scary aspects of a situation.

Affect labeling is an extension of the simple concept that talking about one's feelings can make oneself feel better. Although this idea has been used in talk therapy for over a century, formal research into affect labeling has only begun in recent years. Already, researchers have quantified some of the emotion-regulatory effects of affect labeling, such as decreases in subjective emotional affect, reduced activity in the amygdala, and a lower skin conductance response to frightening stimuli. As a consequence of being a relatively new technique in the area of emotion regulation, affect labeling tends to be compared to, and is often confused with, emotional reappraisal, another emotion-regulatory technique. A key difference between the two is that while reappraisal intuitively feels like a strategy to control one's emotions, affect labeling often does not. Even when someone does not intend to regulate their emotions, the act of labeling one's emotions still has positive effects.

Affect labeling is still in the early stages of research and thus, there is much about it that remains unknown. While there are several theories for the mechanism by which affect labeling acts, more research is needed to provide empirical support for these hypotheses. Additionally, some work has been done on the applications of affect labeling to real-world issues, such as research that suggests affect labeling may be commonplace on social media sites. Affect labeling also sees some use in clinical settings as a tentative treatment for fear and anxiety disorders. Nonetheless, research on affect labeling has largely focused on laboratory studies, and further research is needed to understand its effects in the real world.

== History ==
The notion that talking about or writing down one's feelings can be beneficial is not a recent one. People have kept diaries for centuries, and the use of talk therapy dates back to the beginnings of psychotherapy. Over the past few decades, the idea that putting one's feelings into words can be beneficial has been shown experimentally. More recently, the concept of affect labeling has grown out of this literature, honing in on the emotion regulation aspect of the benefits of vocalizing feelings.

In recent years, research on affect labeling has mostly focused on proving its applicability as an emotion regulation strategy. Although some research exists on the behavioral and neural mechanisms behind its effectiveness, this area of study is still in its early, speculative stages.

== Regulatory effects ==
=== Emotional experience ===
When engaging in affect labeling, subjects subjectively report lower levels of emotional affect than they do in identical conditions without the affect labeling. This effect is not only found when subjects rate their own emotional state, but also when they label the emotion displayed or evoked by stimuli such as images.

=== Autonomic response ===
Autonomic responses characteristic of various emotions may decrease after performing affect labeling. For instance, upon quantifying their level of anger on a rating scale, subjects subsequently experienced decreases in heart rate and cardiac output. Research also indicates that giving labels to aversive stimuli results in a lower skin conductance response when similar aversive stimuli are presented in the future, implying affect labeling can have long-term effects on autonomic responses.

== Neuroscientific basis ==
Research has found that engaging in affect labeling results in higher brain activity within the ventrolateral prefrontal cortex (vlPFC), and reduced activity in the amygdala when compared to other tasks involving emotional stimuli. In addition, evidence from brain lesion studies also point to the vlPFC's involvement in the affect labeling process. Subjects with lesions to the right vlPFC were less able to identify the emotional state of a character throughout a film. This implies that the region is required in order for affect-labeling to take place. Additionally, it has been shown through meta-analysis that while the amygdala is found to be active in tasks involving emotional stimuli, activity is lower when subjects had to identify the emotions rather than simply passively viewing the stimuli.

One theory that integrates these findings proposes that the ventrolateral prefrontal cortex works to down-regulate activity in the amygdala during affect labeling. This theory is supported by evidence from several studies that found negative connectivity between the two brain regions during an affect-labeling task. Furthermore, researchers have used dynamic causal modeling to show specifically that increased activity in the vlPFC is the cause of lower amygdala activity.

== Comparison to emotional reappraisal ==
Emotional reappraisal is an emotion regulation technique where an emotional stimulus is reinterpreted in a new, usually less negative, fashion in order to reduce its effect. As an example, someone might reinterpret a bad test score as being a learning experience, rather than dwelling on the negative aspects of the situation. As it is a related emotion regulation strategy, affect labeling research often draws insight from the existing literature on reappraisal.

The most salient difference between affect labeling and reappraisal lies in people's perception of the efficacy of affect labeling. Unlike reappraisal, affect labeling's effectiveness in regulating emotion is fairly unintuitive. Research has shown that while subjects expect reappraisal to reduce emotional distress, they predict the opposite for affect labeling, expecting the vocalization of feelings to actually increase their emotional distress. In reality, while the magnitude of the reduction in emotional response is found to be stronger for reappraisal than for affect labeling, both strategies produce a noticeable decrease.

Individuals who respond more to reappraisal after the presentation of emotional stimuli tend to also benefit more from affect labeling, indicating they may act through the same mechanism.

Reappraisal and affect labeling share similarities in their neural signatures. As in affect labeling, reappraisal produces activity in the vlPFC while inhibiting response in the amygdala. However, in contrast to affect labeling, reappraisal has also been found to generate activity in the anterior cingulate cortex, supplementary motor area, and dorsolateral prefrontal cortex.

== Possible mechanisms ==
=== Distraction ===
One possible explanation for affect labeling's effectiveness is that it is simply preventing the labeler from fully experiencing the emotional response by drawing their attention away. Distraction techniques have been shown to elicit similar neural activity as affect labeling, with increased activity in the vlPFC and decreased in the amygdala. Additionally, some explicit distraction paradigms have been shown to result in similar reductions of negative emotions.

However, evidence is mixed on this front, as other tasks that involve turning attention away, such as a gender labeling task, do not produce the same reduction. Applications of affect labeling seem to suggest that the mechanism of action is not simply distraction. When applied with exposure therapy, affect labeling was found to be much more effective in reducing skin conductance response than distraction. Affect labeling is also known to result in long-term benefits in clinical settings, whereas distraction is generally considered to negatively affect progress.

=== Self-reflection ===
Another proposed mechanism for affect labeling is through self-reflection. Emotional introspection differs from affect labeling in that it does not require explicit labeling of emotion; however, engaging in introspection has similar effects to affect labeling. As such, rather than being the entire process, affect labeling could act as a first-step in an emotional introspective process. Evidence supporting this mechanism uses a measure of dispositional mindfulness to quantify people's ability to self-reflect. Researchers were able to link dispositional mindfulness to affect labeling by showing that people with higher levels of dispositional mindfulness showed stronger brain activation in regions associated with affect labeling, such as the vlPFC. Additionally, they showed greater reductions in activity in the amygdala, suggesting that mindfulness modulates the effectiveness of affect labeling, and lending support to the idea that introspection is the mechanism of action.

Unfortunately, this theory of affect labeling struggles to explain affect labeling's benefits on stimuli that do not apply to the self. For instance, the regulatory effects of labeling external stimuli, such as faces or aversive images presented during an experiment, are unlikely to be explained by a self-reflective process.

=== Reduction of uncertainty ===
People are known to be ambiguity averse, and the complexity of emotion can often create uncertainty in feelings that are unpleasant. Some researchers believe that affect labeling acts by reducing uncertainty in emotion. This is supported by neural evidence connecting uncertainty to activity in the amygdala. Affect labeling has been shown to down-regulate activity in the amygdala, and this may be a result of the reduction of uncertainty of feelings.

Evidence against this theory is the fact that while some emotions are characteristically uncertain, such as fear or anxiety, others tend to be more straightforward, e.g. sadness and anger. Since affect labeling is known to work across all these types of emotions, it is unlikely that uncertainty reduction is the only mechanism by which it acts.

=== Symbolic conversion ===
Another theory of affect labeling posits that the act of labeling is a sort of symbolic encoding of information, changing the stimulus into language. It has been proposed that this symbolic conversion may act as a type of psychological distancing from the stimulus, leading to overall lower levels of affect. While affect labeling specifically refers to giving labels to emotions, assigning abstract content labels, such as identifying objects as "human", "landscape", etc., has been found to yield many of the same benefits. There is neural evidence to support this as well. Several studies have found that when subjects classify stimuli based on non-emotional categories, they exhibit greater vlPFC activity and less activity in the amygdala, just like in affect labeling. The fact that labeling non-emotional stimuli has similar effects to that of emotional stimuli suggests that the simple act of converting a stimulus into language may be driving the effect.

== Applications ==
=== Social media ===
The act of posting about one's feelings on social media sites such as Twitter is a type of affect labeling. One research study analyzed 74,487 Twitter users' tweets for emotional contact, classifying tweets as either before or after instances of affect labeling, which were identified as tweets stating "I feel...". The researchers found that emotions tended to increase in valence over time in tweets preceding the affect labeling tweet, with the greatest positive or negative emotion being experienced closest to the act of labeling. After the affect labeling tweet, the emotional intensity of the following tweets was found to fall off quickly, going back to baseline levels of valence. The results of this study support the application of affect labeling as an emotion regulation strategy in real-world settings, and show that social media users engage, potentially unknowingly, in affect labeling all the time.

=== Mental health ===
A small body of work has begun to look at affect labeling's potential as a clinical treatment in conjunction with exposure therapy for phobias, anxiety disorders, and other stress disorders.

One study found that subjects with high public speaking anxiety who chose from a set of predetermined emotion words to describe their feelings before giving a speech in front of an audience showed greater reductions in anxiety, quantified by physiological responses such as heart rate, than subjects who performed a control, shape-matching, task before giving their speeches. These results suggest that combining affect labeling with an exposure treatment is more effective than exposure alone. Notably, the affect labeling and control conditions found no difference in self-reported anxiety; however, physiological responses characteristic of anxiety were reduced for the subjects who performed the affect labeling.

Another study found similar results in spider-fearful individuals, exposing them to a tarantula over two days while simultaneously verbalizing their feelings. Compared to subjects in reappraisal, distraction, and control conditions, subjects who engaged in affect labeling showed lower skin conductance response than the other conditions, although there was no difference between conditions in self-reported fear.

Although there is tentative evidence for the value of affect labeling in clinical settings, researchers acknowledge that there is still a need for many more studies drawing from clinical populations in order to deduce the value of using affect labeling in conjunction with other treatments before it can be safely adopted into practice.

== Limitations and concerns ==
The use of self-report measures of emotion in psychological research may invoke affect labeling, even in studies unrelated to the topic. Whether or not this poses a problem for emotion researchers is still largely unknown.

Although affect labeling appears be effective in laboratory studies with many participants, as with all psychological phenomena, individuals will vary in their experience. The reasons for individual differences in the effectiveness of affect labeling are in need of further research. Furthermore, paradigms used to study affect labeling differ widely, with some providing subjects with pre-prepared labels to select, while others require subjects to self-generate their own labels. These paradigms produce noticeable differences in results, with self-generative paradigms finding more long-term delayed effects of regulation, and pre-prepared paradigms finding immediate effects. The explanation for the differences in these results is still relatively unexplored, though some suspect it may be due to pre-prepared labels implying a kind of interpersonal emotion regulation, since it may be interpreted as a kind of support from the experimenter.

Whether or not the laboratory findings about affect labeling are applicable to affect labeling in the real world is another question researchers must ask. The situations in which people use affect labeling in real life are rich with context, and it is difficult to say whether the particular operationalizations of affect labeling used in a study allow the results to generalize.

== See also ==
- Emotional self-regulation
- Affect (psychology)
- Affect regulation
- Appraisal theory
- Interpersonal emotion regulation
- Exposure therapy
- Social media
