= Life-span model of motivation =

According to the Life-span model of motivation the personal goals that individuals set are a function of the opportunities and challenges that are present in their social environment. Personal goals are an important determinant to the way individuals direct their development. The model introduces four key processes; channeling, choice, co-agency, and compensation.

== The 4 C's ==
Developmental trajectories are channeled by the social environment, which represents the "opportunity space" for development. In addition, individuals are active agents in constructing their development and hence make choices regarding their goals and commitments. Given that development occurs in a social context, others in the environment such as peers, family members, or teachers have a role in co-regulation of development. And last, success and failures in personal goals and tasks serve as feedback and basis for compensation in order to optimize development. Self-regulation is important in development, and impacts people’s adjustment to personal goals. These four areas of motivation in development are dependent upon personal self-regulation. (2)

Channeling

Channeling is important in developing motivation because it creates an identity through conversation. A study in storytelling suggests that introversion and extraversion are often determined through social cues. 4. Pairs were placed with those similar to them in sociality. Introverted pairs talked more in a way to develop the story, while extroverts often changed topics. Placing the pairs together as friends helped motivate conversation and motivate sociality through channeling.

Choices

Choices help develop intrinsic motivation, which helps one to develop an identity. Having intrinsic motivation and being able to make independent choices in adolescence, for example, can help resolve an identity crisis. Choices helps one to feel the independence needed in adolescence to make decisions about the future, and feel confident in their identity.

Co-regulation

Co-regulation is sustained often through collaborative learning for young adults in schools and universities. Interactions between groups and motivation to complete projects is higher when co-regulation is high. Co-regulation has been found to be an important factor in completing projects in a group setting. Features of development are found in motivating students through group projects, and co-regulation helps one take self-responsibility. This study shows the sociality in co-regulation, and how important interaction is in terms of motivation and development for adolescents.

Compensation

Compensation helps encourage motivation for adults as they work in their careers. Motivation often comes in careers through compensation. Compensation can come socially, financially and in many other ways. Compensation can be a factor in work motivation. Along with compensation in rewarding work through financial compensation, compensation through the failure and success of goals create motivation. Whether or not people respond well to failure is an important factor of development. During failures, self-compassion is important in creating motivation, so that there is an inner form of compensation.
