= Social sharing of emotions =

Psychological phenomenon

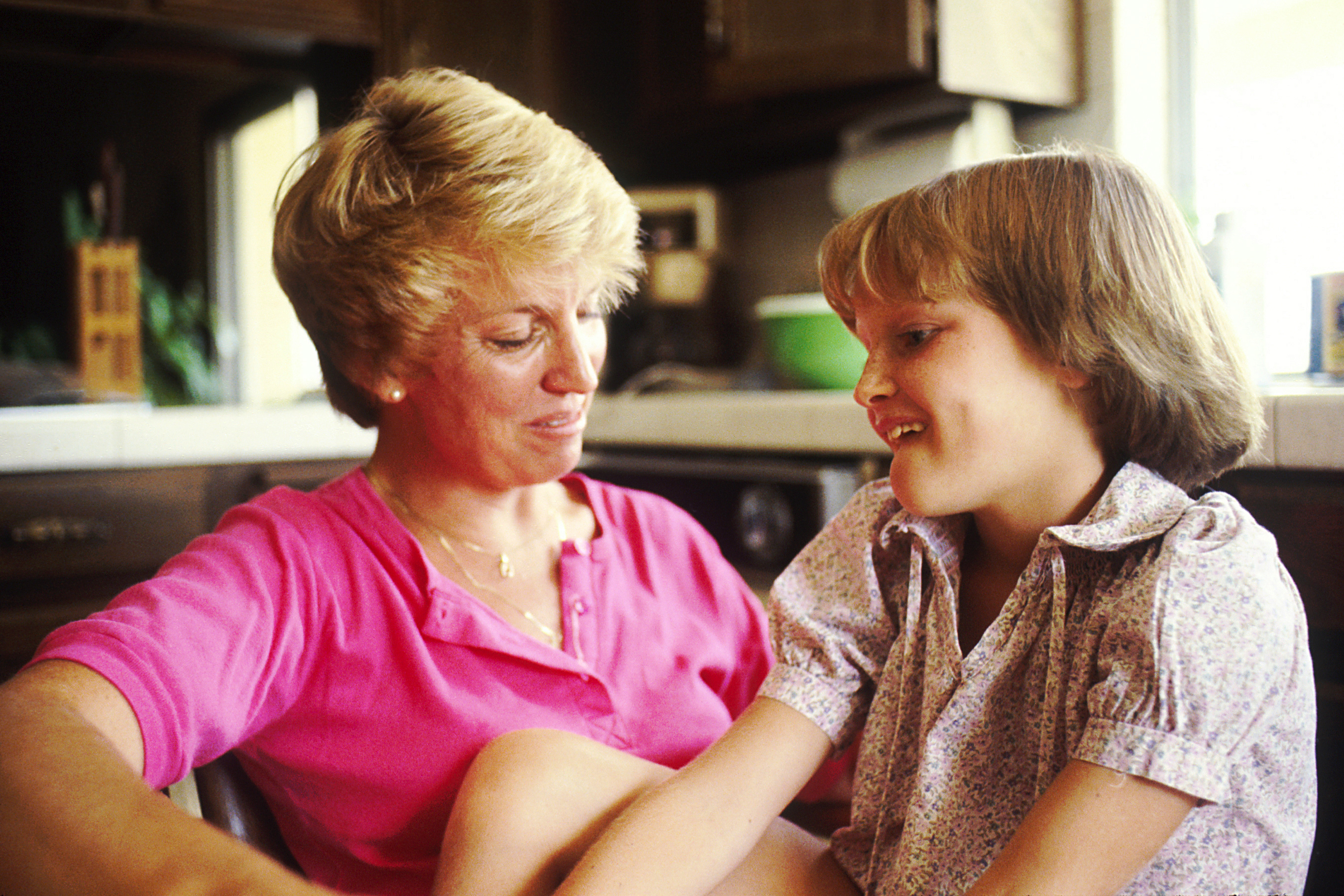
A young girl shares a pleasant emotional experience with her mother.

The social sharing of emotions is a phenomenon in the field of psychology that concerns the tendency to recount and share emotional experiences with others. According to this area of research, emotional experiences are not uniquely fleeting and internal. Scientific studies of catastrophes and important life events demonstrate the propensity of victims to talk about their experiences and express their emotions. At the onset of these empirical studies, Rimé et al. coined the term "social sharing of emotions" in 1991 to name the observed phenomenon. This research was a significant development in social psychology because it questioned the accepted view of emotions—that emotions are short-lived and intrapersonal episodes—that was prevalent in the literature. Yet, the first set of experiments revealed that 88–96% of emotional experiences are shared and discussed to some degree. Therefore, the studies concerning the social sharing of emotions contribute a substantial new perspective to the understanding of emotions and their underlying processes.

== Background ==
=== Context (historic view of emotion) ===
In 1991, Rimé et al. noted that in contemporary scientific research, emotions were considered to be responses to preceding events that are then restrained by self-control and self-restoration. As such, emotions were generally regarded as ephemeral and intrapersonal experiences. Rimé also later pointed out that attachment theory rendered emotional regulation to be of an interpersonal nature for children, yet to become mature adults one must become autonomous and capable of regulating emotions independently. In the field of psychology a healthy individual is typically seen as "self-contained, independent and self-reliant, capable of asserting himself and influencing his environment". Riger also suggests that this individualistic view of emotional regulation could have been influenced by the context within which it had been studied, i.e. the United States.

=== Relevant literature ===
In 1954 Leon Festinger, a well known social psychologist, presented his influential social comparison theory, which proposes that people seek to obtain accurate self-evaluations by comparing themselves to similar others. Furthermore, people turn to their social environment to search for clarification when faced with obscure or confusing environmental situations or sensations. Thus extending this theory to emotions would posit that after experiencing emotional situations that do not conform to held expectations or that are ambiguous, one would be expected to later share that emotional experience with others. Festinger's other well-known theory of cognitive dissonance, proposed in 1957, offers further evidence for why such a process might occur. Because emotional experiences are unexpected, they can affect one's self-concept and thus challenge one's system of beliefs. According to Festinger, when people's expectations do not manifest themselves, a cognitive dissonance is created between the expectations and reality and people seek to reduce this dissonance by rationalizing the discrepancy. So after experiencing an emotion, people would be expected to communicate the event with others in order to help reduce their cognitive dissonance. An article by Thoits emphasizes the importance of the ability of others to assist in the process of coping. Other people are able to offer new perspectives on interpretations of the emotional event. In previous studies, Rimé concluded that emotions necessitate "cognitive articulation" because of their dense, complex nature. By using language to express an experience, people are forced to classify and organize the contents of the emotions, and furthermore can concretize and objectivize the experience into a script that can be more easily understood. Rimé also notes that the social environment can point people towards socially acceptable ways of defining the experience.

=== Precursory studies of trauma ===
The idea of the social sharing of emotion derived from studies about emotional trauma. These studies show that after natural disasters, catastrophes, or life-changing events people have a tendency to talk about their experiences and disclose their feelings and emotions. For example, in a 1975 study exploring the psychological reactions to the death of a loved one, it was found that 88% of bereavers felt a need to talk about the event to others. Other studies produced similar findings for people who experienced natural disasters and for cancer patients. Rimé later proposed the term "social sharing of emotions" to describe this phenomenon. Research indicates that the strong emotional experiences that are present during and following trauma and crises can be inherently adaptive and can lead to growth in resilience, altruism, and community engagement. In order for this growth to occur, collective engagement and processing of these emotional experiences is necessary.

== Definition and central characteristics ==
Social sharing of emotions can be defined as an "interpersonal process" wherein, after an emotional event, "individuals will initiate interpersonal behaviours in which discussing this event and their reactions to it is central". In other words, the social sharing of emotions is the process of reactivating the emotion at a more symbolic level, all taking place as part of ensuing interpersonal interactions.

Furthermore, Rimé et al. offered two defining characteristics of the phenomenon:

1. That the emotion is recalled in a "socially shared language".
2. That this recall is shared with an addressee (even if the addressee is symbolic).

== Initial studies ==
The first studies about social sharing of emotion explore individual aspects of the process. These studies aimed to answer questions concerning when it occurs, with whom, how long after the emotional event, if there are age, gender or cultural differences, how often it occurs for a given emotional event, etc.

The first empirical research about the social sharing of emotions was conducted in 1991. These were retrospective studies where participants filled out a questionnaire which asked them to recall a specific personal experience that provoked an emotion. They then were asked to respond to questions related to their social sharing behaviors related to that event. In all of these studies, 88–96% of emotional experiences were followed by social sharing of those experiences at least one time.

However, such retrospective studies were subject to certain biases that may have affected the results. For example, the participants could have been influenced by a number of memory biases such as a possible selective memory bias for events that were more emotionally intense, or a possible bias to more easily recall more recent events.

Because of these possible biases, further studies were conducted using daily diaries. Every night, participants were asked to write down the most significant event of their day and then answer various questions related to the social sharing of that event. In one of these studies (study 2), 58% of emotional events were shared the same day that the event occurred.

There were also further follow-up studies conducted using a different approach. In these follow-up studies the experimenters contacted certain individuals after foreseeable emotional experiences, such as the birth of a child, giving blood, or taking an exam. This way, the experimenters chose not only the emotional event to be recalled, but furthermore the types of emotional events they would be studying so that they could examine possible differences between types of emotional events. The findings of these studies supported those of the retrospective studies: 96–100% of emotional events were socially shared. Furthermore, no significant difference was found in the frequency of social sharing between different types of emotional events.

While these two methodologies did help to eliminate some of the possible biases of the original studies, they still operated under the assumption that there is a causal link between the emotional experience and the development of the process of social sharing. Therefore, a true experimental method was used to study the phenomenon. In these studies, two friends came together to the laboratory, and they were then split up. One of the subjects watched an excerpt of one of three films: either from a documentary about animals (weak emotion), a violent scene between animals (moderate emotion), or a scene depicting humans committing cruel acts towards animals (strong emotion). During this time, the other subject was given a trivial task to complete. Then, the two subjects were reunited and asked to wait a few minutes for the next part of the experiment. During this time, their conversations were recorded and analyzed for the presence of social sharing. All of these methods produced similar results; social sharing was found to occur for 88–96% of emotional events.

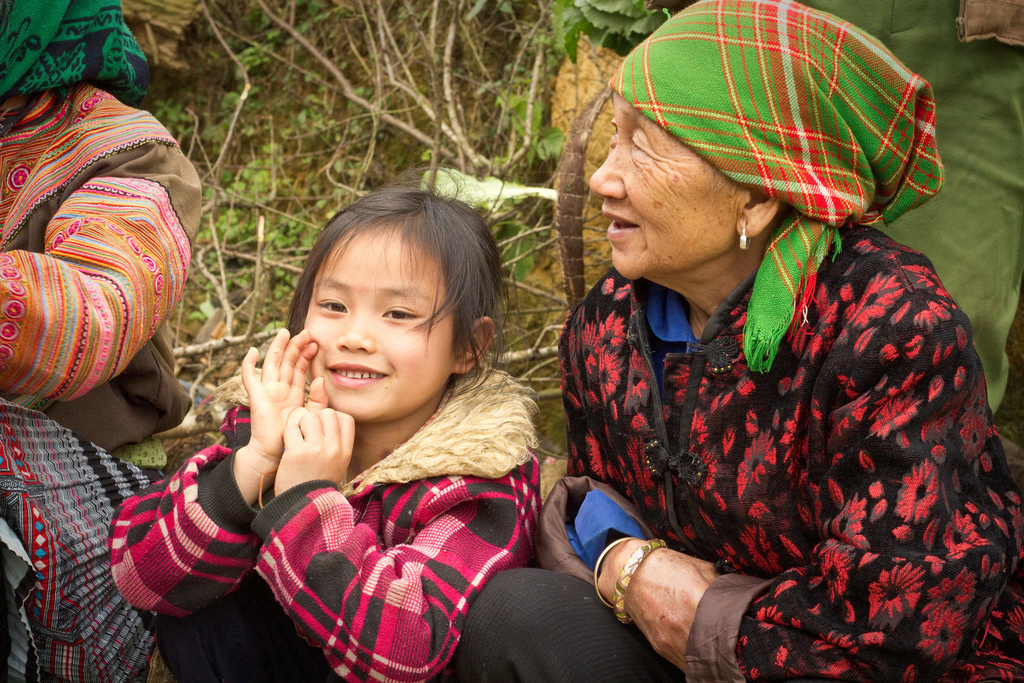
Social sharing of emotions appears to occur in similar ways regardless of age, education, gender, or cultural background.

=== General findings ===
==== Gender ====
While there exist strong stereotypes that women express themselves and talk about their emotions with others more than men do, the results from the above studies indicate that on the contrary there are no sex differences concerning the amount of social sharing of emotion between men and women. However, although no such quantitative sex differences were found, one qualitative difference was found between the social sharing behaviors of males and females, and that is with whom they choose to share. Women tend to share their emotions equally between family members, close friends, and spouses/partners. On the other hand, men tend to share more exclusively with their partners/spouses and less so with close friends and family members.

==== Age ====
Changes in who people choose as the targets of social sharing are evident spanning the life cycle. The targets of social sharing in children 6–8 years old are typically attachment figures (i.e. parents) and not peers. Research on preadolescents found that the targets are still predominantly attachment figures (mother 93%; father 89%), but at this age the social sharing is extended to siblings, sometimes to peers, and can even be to pets, grandparents, or a teddy bear. Adolescents tend to choose among family members or friends, while young adults confide equally in family, friends, and partners (study 2), and mature adults tend to choose their partners (study 3).

==== Education ====
A large number of psychological studies recruit college students to participate for reasons of convenience, and the studies on the social sharing of emotion were no exception. For this reason, the question was raised of whether the level of education plays a role in these sharing behaviors. A 1998 study addressed this question by analyzing data from a cross-sectional study of girls in elementary school, middle school, high school, girls pursuing an undergraduate education in college, and girls pursuing a master's degree. Despite possible reasons to believe that education might increase the capacity to and likelihood of sharing behaviors, no differences were found.

==== Culture ====
Similar to the problems of a restricted educational background, the subjects of the first studies on the social sharing of emotions were limited to Belgian and French populations. While later studies conducted in Netherlands, Italy, and Spain produced similar results to the first studies, the question of whether social sharing exists in non-Western cultures. The first intercultural study compared Dutch subjects to Turkish and Surinamese immigrants, and the findings showed that social sharing was a prominent behavior in each group, although slightly less so for the Surinamese subjects. Other studies comparing Western and Eastern cultures produced similar results, finding that Eastern cultures had slightly lower rates of social sharing. Furthermore, several general qualitative differences were found between Western and Eastern populations. On average, Western subjects shared an emotional event more often (5–6 times) than Asian subjects (2–3 times). There was also a longer delay between the emotional event and the social sharing for Asian groups than for Western ones. These differences could be explained by the collectivistic-individualistic culture continuum. In this case, these differences could reflect the extent of social networking typically seen in each culture. In an individualistic culture, this social networking is more diversified than in the collectivistic cultures, where family is generally the center of the network. Additionally, these differences could reflect the closeness of the interpersonal relationships in collectivistic cultures, where it can be difficult for individuals to recognize when the social sharing occurs because they are so often together.

== Sharing vs. not sharing an emotional experience ==
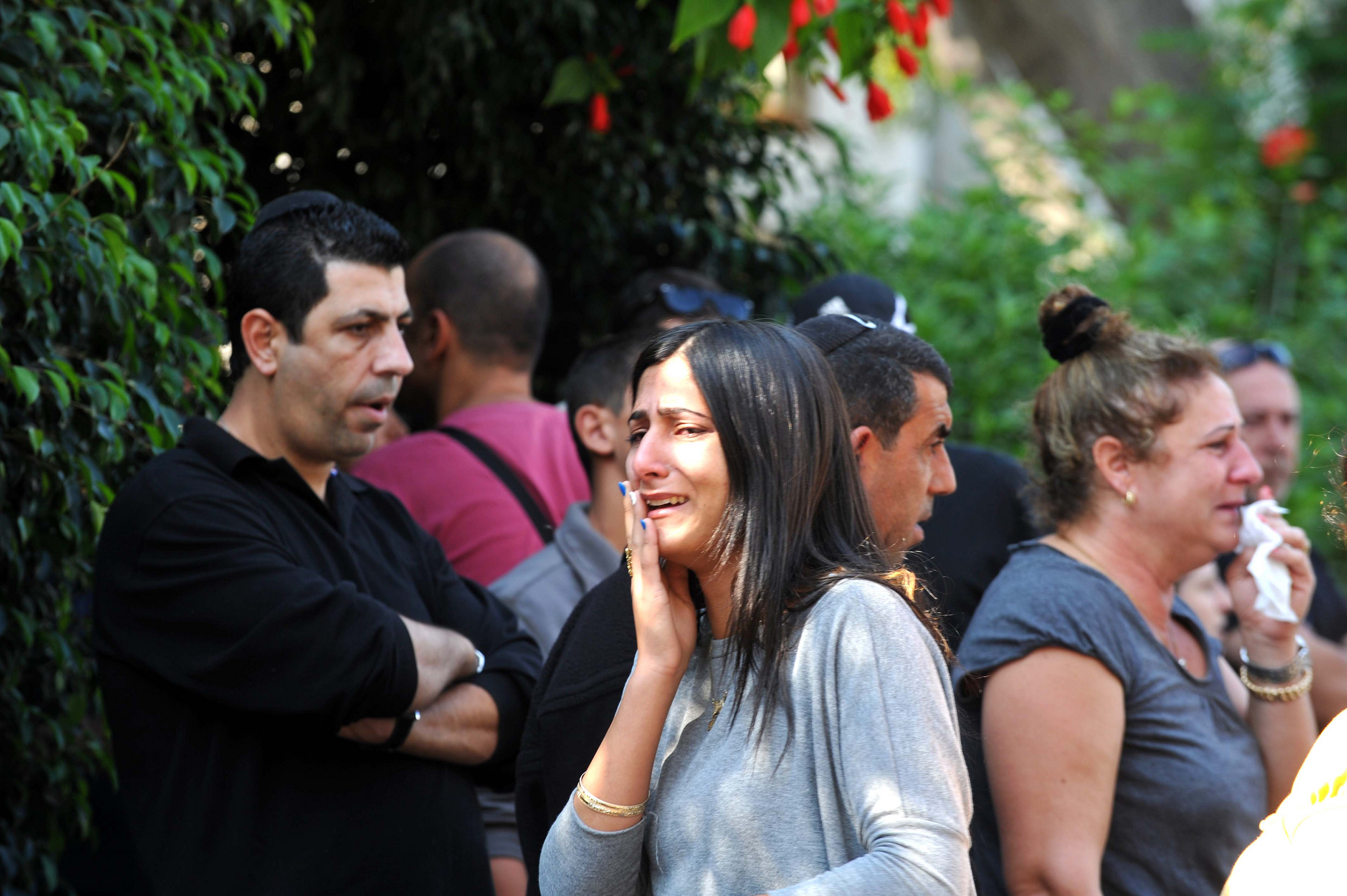
According to several studies, 80–95% of emotional episodes are shared.

The results of the above studies on the social sharing of emotion reveal that such behaviors are very common and are in fact the norm, transcending boundaries of gender, age, level of education, culture, etc. However, if social sharing occurs on average for 80–95% of emotional events, that leaves 5–20% that are not discussed and are perhaps purposefully kept secret.

=== Motives for social sharing ===
A study conducted in 2007 sought to determine why people believe they share emotional episodes. According to self reports by participants, there are several main reasons why people initiate social sharing behaviors (in no particular order):

- Rehearse—to remember or re-experience the event
- Vent—to express or alleviate pent-up emotions, to attempt catharsis
- Obtain help, support, and comfort—to receive consolation and sympathy
- Legitimization—to validate one's emotions of the event and have them approved
- Clarification and meaning—to clarify certain aspects of the event that were not well understood, to find meaning in the happenings of the event
- Advice—to seek guidance and find solutions to problems created by the event
- Bonding—to become closer to others and reduce feelings of loneliness
- Empathy—to emotionally arouse or touch the listener
- Draw attention—to receive attention from others, possibly to impress others
- Entertain—to engage others and facilitate social interactions

=== Keeping an emotional event a secret ===
A popular notion is that people might not share extremely intense emotional events because they are simply inexpressible. Along with this idea, psychologists initially hypothesized that the extreme nature of such experiences would play an important role in determining whether an emotional event is shared or not. Additionally, they thought that people would be motivated not to deliberately revisit such events because they would reactivate the extreme negative emotions that accompanied the events. However, their studies revealed that there was no difference in the average emotional intensity between events that were shared compared to those that were kept secret.

While the intensity of the emotion does not seem to influence whether an emotional event is shared or kept secret, the type of emotion involved does appear to play a role. Specifically, emotional experiences involving feelings of shame and guilt tend to be shared less frequently, less often, and with fewer people. While sharing of emotional events involves self-disclosure, feelings of shame and guilt are associated with concealment of the self.

==== Social function ====
The social sharing of emotions is an important source of interpersonal interaction, social integration, and forming positive and durable relationships. In fact, many people engage in sharing behaviors in order to have such social interactions and strengthen their relationships (as described above). However, this might not result from the sharing of certain emotional events. When asked why they would keep an emotional event a secret, the most frequent reasons cited were: wanting to avoid hurting someone, preserving one's image in the eyes of others, protecting one's private life, and protecting one's self. Such reasons, which together constituted the responses of over 75% of participants, all concern one thing: protection. According to Baumeister and Leary, this idea of protection pertains to protection from undesirable consequences in the realm of the social sphere, namely that the revelation of such secrets would be harmful to social relationships. Therefore, instead of social integration and the strengthening of relationships, the revelation of certain emotional events could be harmful to a relationship and could thus result in social disintegration and deterioration of relationships.

== Social considerations ==
Whereas initial studies were focused on the behaviors of the person who shares their own emotions, later studies examined the impact of such interaction on the "recipient" of the social sharing (the person who listened to the recounting of the emotional event). Findings from these experiments led to the emergence of further questions exploring other aspects of social sharing of emotions, such as which emotions are elicited in the recipient, what processes occur after listening an emotional episode, how this type of sharing affects intimate relationships, etc. These new lines of study allowed the identification of other elements of the process, such as the 'secondary social sharing' of emotions.

=== Recipient of social sharing ===
There is scientific evidence suggesting that exposure to the narration of an emotional experience has several effects on the target person: increased autonomic arousal among subjects listening to a distressed person, heightened anxiety among subjects who listened to other people disclosing intimate aspects of themselves and depressive and hostile sentiments for subjects exposed to a 15-minute conversation with someone who is depressed

=== Secondary social sharing of emotions ===
From the above evidence it can be concluded that exposure to the social sharing of an emotion is itself an emotion-eliciting event, it would follow that the listener too would later share that experience with other people. Christophe et Rimé called this subsequent phenomenon secondary social sharing of emotions. In other words, the receiver of the social sharing will consequently experience some kind of emotion, so the receiver will then become a transmitter of the narration as a part of their emotional experience of hearing the story.

The first studies about secondary social sharing in 1997 confirmed the existence of this phenomenon. In the first study, subjects reported particularly strong sentiments of interest and of surprise as a result of hearing someone recount an emotional experience. In 66.4% of the cases, subjects shared the episode again to some third person. Furthermore, subjects who reported higher emotional intensity in response to hearing the emotional story shared their experience and the story more often after the situation. This suggested that the frequency of sharing grows in relation to the intensity of the emotions felt when listening. In a second study, Christophe et Rimé proposed to subjects to recall an emotional experience according to an intensity level given (low, moderate, high). In this study, when emotional intensity was rated higher, more secondary social sharing occurred (79% of the cases). This again confirmed that the more intense emotions were after hearing an account of an emotional experience, the greater the propensity for secondary social sharing.

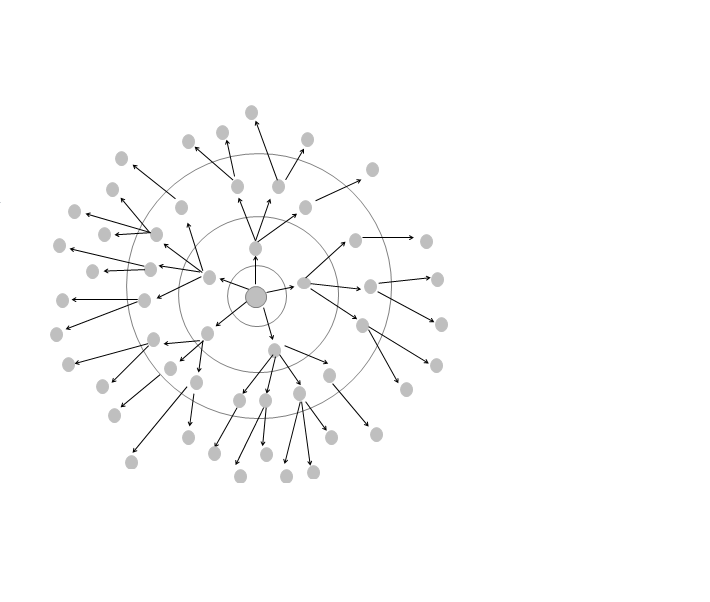
A diagram illustrating social sharing as well as secondary and tertiary social sharing, Rimé p. 173

Moreover, for 41% of cases, secondary social sharing occurred the very same day as the primary social sharing situation. Yet secondary sharing is not necessarily a short-lived occurrence; participants reported that they sometimes still talked about the episode several times, and sometimes talked about it several months later. It is important to point out that the secondary social sharing is not limited to negative emotional episodes, but instead can occur after positive emotional episodes as well. In one study, 83% of the participants reported some degree of secondary social sharing in response to both positive and negative emotional situation, with no differences found between these two valences. However, there were some qualitative differences between secondary sharing for each: for positive emotional episodes, secondary social sharing was initiated faster and with a higher number of repetitions and targets than for negatives emotional episodes.

==== Extension of secondary social sharing of emotions ====
Social sharing of emotions can and does extend beyond just the secondary level. The original subject might share the experience (primary social sharing) with 5 other people. These people in turn share the experience (secondary social sharing) with more people, possibly 3–4. According to one study, these 'tertiary' individuals will again share the experience with 2 or 3 people, at least in 64% of cases. In total, 5 people are implicated by primary social sharing, then 18 more people by secondary social sharing, and finally 30 additional people by tertiary social sharing, summing to over 50 people total from the one event. This idea has important implications concerning the link between the individual and the collective, as well as with ideas such as collective memory, as discussed below.

=== Social dynamics between actor and recipient ===
==== Confidentiality ====
Despite the fact that in certain situations people share personal or emotional information with non-intimate others, data shows that the target of the social sharing is usually a close relative or an intimate other, about 85% of the time. However, a paradox arises when considering the secondary social sharing of emotions; on the one hand, socially sharing an emotional experience with an intimate other presupposes confidentiality, yet in the majority of cases those experiences become the subject of secondary sharing to other people. In one study, secondary social sharing occurred two or more times for 53% of the cases, and with two or more people 54% of the time. More importantly, another study found that in 73% of investigated cases, subjects reported that they shared the identity of the original sharer with the third person during secondary sharing. These two studies indicate that confidentiality can be somewhat of an illusion; once an emotional experience is socially shared, confidentiality may actually be the exception rather than the rule.

==== Response of recipient ====
Through a series of studies, a classification of the recipient's general behaviors and responses during social sharing of emotions was created. Five general classes of behaviors have been identified:

1. Social support: attempts at comforting, expressing unconditional support, showing empathy and understanding
2. Physical gestures: non-verbal comfort or consolation, such as hugging, kissing, or touching
3. Concrete actions: talking about or attempting to do something outside of the emotional situation (i.e. distraction)
4. De-dramatization: putting the situation in perspective, telling the person that it happens to other people, that it is not so bad, etc.
5. Questioning: asking more information or clarifying things about the experience

These responses could vary depending on the magnitude of the emotional episode heard. Subjects who listened to highly emotional experiences exhibited less verbal expression, attempted less de-dramatization, and much more nonverbal comforting.

Further studies tried to understand the behaviors and roles of each person during the interaction through a series of three studies. In the first two experiments, subjects were invited to watch a short film (non-emotional, moderate and intense emotional conditions) while their partner (a real friend) was given a non-stimulating task to complete. Right after that, they were put in the same room together while they waited for the second part of the experiment. During this time, their conversation was recorded in order to analyze it for any manifestations of social sharing. In these studies, the duration of social sharing was significantly higher in the intense emotion condition than in the non-emotional and moderate emotion conditions, and was the only condition in which social sharing was substantial enough to justify calculating the individual contributions of targets and partners to the social sharing process. Consistent with the hypothesis that a person exposed to an emotion would socially share it, targets contributed to the social sharing component of the conversation to a much greater extent than did partners (81.8% and 18.2% of the time, respectively).

In the second experiment, the social sharing tended to decline as time passed, but the intense emotion condition elicited significantly more sharing during the first two minutes that the subjects were together. The findings again suggest that intensity of the emotion and the extent of sharing are not linked monotonically. In both studies, about 90% of the verbal exchanges were comments by targets. Targets' expressions predominantly consisted of "giving information" and "expressing feelings" about the movie, thereby conforming to the formal definition of the social sharing of emotion. On the other hand, the partners' comments were found to be brief and to consist mainly of requests for further information and expressions of feelings elicited by the targets' sharing. In this regard, the findings are quite consistent with previous research showing that the sharing of an emotion elicits emotional responses for the listeners. According to Luminet et al. these results suggest that social sharing fulfills informational goals as well as emotional ones.

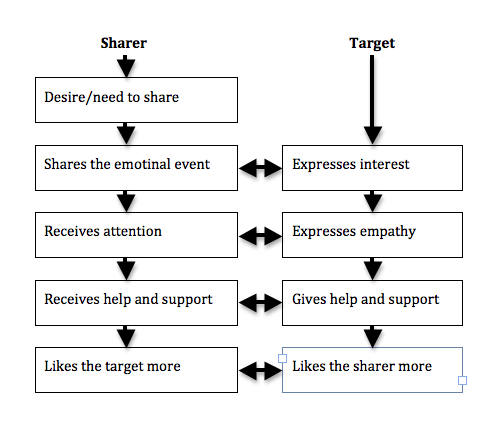
Interpersonal dynamic of social sharing of emotion, Rimé p. 129

For the third study, subjects were invited to watch a short film and to answer some questionnaires two days later. The goal of this study was to determine whether the same social sharing occurs in the real life. The results showed once again that a higher level of sharing results from exposure to the intense emotion condition. The findings observed in the first two experiments were therefore reproduced in this third study, despite the different method of measuring social sharing. Together, these results strongly suggest that the emotional intensity of the event determined the extent of social sharing.

==== Effect on relationships ====
According to Rimé, if the social sharing experience is a pleasant one, it could help to strengthen socio-affective links between the two people. As seen in the diagram, social sharing can result in reciprocal affection between the two people involved, and can play an obvious role in attachment. When the social sharing is done between partners in an intimate relationship, it could be seen as a reinforcement of their affective bond.

== Collective aspects ==
The phenomenon of the social sharing of emotions extends beyond just the realm of psychology; it also has been considered in the context of anthropology. Because an emotional episode is shared with a group of people, it becomes part of a shared knowledge within that group. As discussed above, knowledge of an event experienced by a single person can extend to more than 50 people via secondary and tertiary social sharing, thus the event has become a shared part of a relatively large group of people. Yet, an event can be extended to even larger groups of people, perhaps even whole communities or even nations, when the event is very intense one or when many people concurrently experience the event.

=== Relation to collective memory ===
In the simplest terms, collective memory can be understood as the memory of a group of people, and is usually associated with the passing of that memory from generation to generation. However, there are many nuances to this idea; it must also be considered in terms of the processes of remembering and forgetting events. Thus, when a typical emotional event is socially shared and propagates to perhaps 50 other people, that event becomes a collective memory for that group or community of people. When the emotional event is particularly intense, the event would be expected to undergo an even larger diffusion. Furthermore, the more intense the emotional event is, the more rapid the diffusion should be and should reach more people in a shorter amount of time. This is especially true for events that are shared via mass media, such as newspapers, magazines, television, internet, etc. In this case, the collective memory is no longer confined to a local population, but instead can become that of a regional, national, or even international population. Besides the propagation of a single person's emotional event, many people can simultaneously experience a single national emotional event, such as the disappearing of an important person. Such an event also becomes part of a collectively shared memory. However, each person still has their own personal memory of the event, such as where they were when they experienced the event, what they were doing, etc.

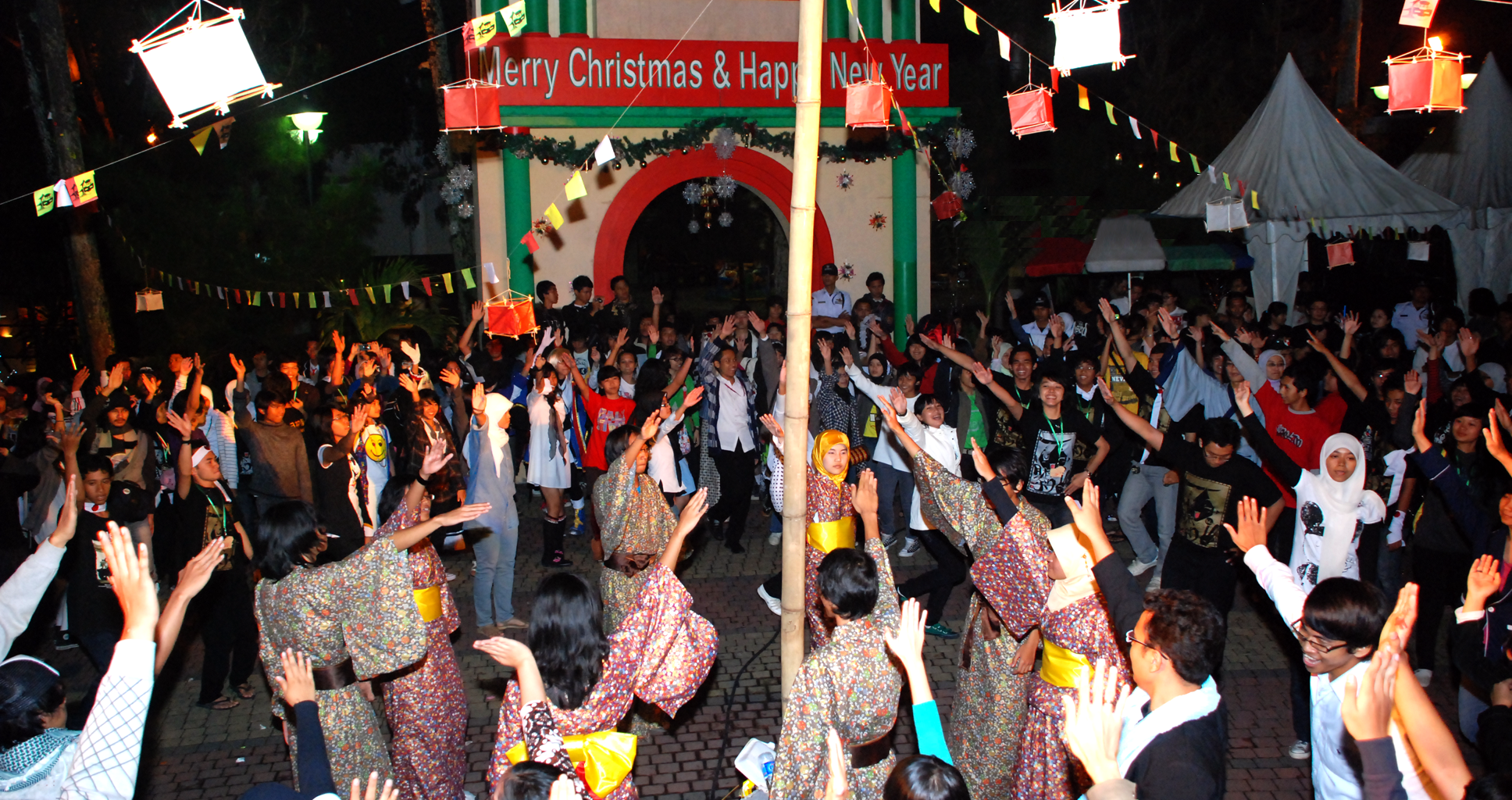
A group of people during an event that involves collective social sharing

=== Social rituals ===
While some emotional events, like the one described above, are experienced concurrently by many people as a matter of chance, others are sometimes purposefully created within and between a group of people.

Social sharing behaviors incite a socio-affective dynamic between the involved persons and according to several studies, may produce interpersonal benefits, and this can result in further social integration. Humans have long been aware of such processes, and have been using and even exploiting them for a long time. A particularly prominent example of such purposeful collective social sharing is the celebration or commemoration of collective events (such as war victories and defeats or natural disasters), ceremonies, symbols, symbolic characters or stories, etc. According to Frijda, such collective instances of social sharing are created for similar reasons to those for individual instances; the event has not been fully integrated into the lives of the participants. For collective social sharing, this may mean that the emotions elicited by the event are reactivated in the people who actually experienced the event, or that the emotional event is being reproduced for successive generations who did not actually experience the event because the event represents an important memory of the group. Following this idea, the collective rituals and symbols are likened to conventional social sharing situations, which both cause a reactivation of the emotions that were lived or relived.

=== The symbolic universe ===
People possess an inherent ensemble of basic beliefs about themselves, others, the world, etc. Such "naïve theories" are what compose our symbolic universe. One's symbolic universe is part of a socially shared knowledge, transmitted principally as a result of education and social communication, with a large emphasis on the process of attachment through which parents impart their visions of the world, their symbolic universes, to their children. Such symbolic universes guide how we make sense of the world, and are composed of a relatively stable network of ideologies. Therefore, if one of these beliefs is compromised, the stability of the entire network could be jeopardized. It is very important for people to maintain a sense of stability within such a system of beliefs, so they have a natural psychological motivation to try to protect these beliefs. Because such beliefs have a fundamentally social origin, their revalidation can only be legitimized through a social consensus. Along these lines, aforementioned social rituals came to be used as a more structured way of re-substantiating beliefs that have been invalidated as a result of an emotional event.

=== Nuances of collective memories ===
Primary social sharing of emotions involves "repeated reproduction", where the same individuals report their memories of an episode on several different occasions. Secondary social sharing involves a different process in which recalled information is transmitted through a chain of people. During social sharing, originally unclear cognitive aspects were likely to be modified into meaningful ones. However, memory is also affected by the people's store of relevant prior knowledge. Thus, in secondary social sharing of emotion, people are likely to process the emotional information they are exposed to through the filter of their preexisting beliefs and views (i.e. their symbolic universe). When people encounter events and information that fits into these beliefs, those events and information tend to blend in and thus be overlooked. On the other hand, those that do not fit within their schemas will be very salient and therefore memorized, being reproduced later when recounting the event. For episodes of weak emotional intensity, the process is likely to have limited consequences for social knowledge of the emotion because the number of serial repetitions recounting the event will usually be low. For strong emotional episodes however, there is reason to expect that, due to the combination of the number of repeated reproduction and the related number of serial reproductions, the collective memory of the emotional event will be affected.

== See also ==
- Emotional contagion
- Emotional expression
- Group emotion
- Interpersonal relationship
- Interpersonal emotion regulation
- Social cognition
- Social emotion
- Social neuroscience
