= Hedonic asymmetry =

Emotional concept

Hedonic asymmetry refers to the idea that pleasure naturally diminishes when satisfaction is sustained over time, whereas emotional pain can persist under ongoing adverse conditions. This occurs because adversity continuously violates personal goals, keeping negative emotions active. Dutch psychologist Nico Frijda describes this as a "stern and bitter law" because it highlights the unrelenting nature of emotions as signals that demand a response. Unlike some emotions that may fade, negative emotions endure as long as the adverse conditions persist, making this law implacable. However, research suggests that in certain contexts—such as food consumption and consumer behavior—positive emotions can be more dominant, shaping preferences and experiences. This interplay between positive and negative emotions influences decision-making, relationships, and overall well-being, often requiring conscious effort to maintain positive emotional states through practices like gratitude, mindfulness, and cognitive reframing.

== Theoretical interpretation ==
An expanded interpretation of hedonic asymmetry emphasizes the differing temporal dynamics of positive and negative emotions. According to this view, emotional pain tends to persist as long as adverse conditions continue, while emotional pleasure naturally fades unless renewed by novelty or changing circumstances. This supports the foundational theory proposed by Nico Frijda, reinforcing the notion that negative emotions are more resistant to dissipation, functioning as enduring signals of unresolved problems or unmet goals.

Pleasure, particularly in sensory domains such as food or intimacy, is described as being highly context-sensitive and dependent on novelty. These experiences are often not fully registered in the moment but are instead anticipated or recalled, which may contribute to their transitory nature. In contrast, discomfort and distress are more likely to maintain emotional salience when the triggering situation remains unresolved. This asymmetry has implications for mood regulation, as it helps explain the relative difficulty in sustaining positive emotional states over time.

== Examples ==
=== General emotion research ===
The study of emotions in psychological research tends to emphasize negative emotions more than positive ones. This is evident in the classification of basic emotions, where negative emotions are often more numerous (e.g., Ekman, 1972; Plutchik, 1980). A similar trend is observed in research on food-related emotions, which primarily examines the negative emotional responses linked to unhealthy eating behaviors. Understanding these emotional patterns can aid in the development of effective interventions for managing or preventing eating disorders. However, in individuals without such conditions, the emotional aspects of food consumption remain an important area of study.

=== Food consumption ===
Research by the Multidisciplinary Digital Publishing Institute highlights the predominance of positive emotions in food-related experiences, a phenomenon known as the Theory of Positive Asymmetry. This theory suggests that consumers generally associate food with positive emotions due to hedonic preferences, sensory appeal, and past experiences. However, negative emotions can also arise, though they are less frequently reported. Prior studies confirm that people overwhelmingly use positive language when describing food, while negative emotions occur selectively, often linked to specific sensory attributes or prior negative experiences. Understanding these emotional associations helps predict consumer behavior, product preferences, and market trends in food and beverage consumption.

=== Consumer products ===
It has been found that emotions elicited by consumer products primarily tend to be positive, differing from the general focus in emotion research, which emphasizes negative emotions. Negative emotions are typically linked to immediate action and survival instincts, while positive emotions encourage investment in products by enhancing well-being and expanding cognitive and behavioral possibilities. Positive emotions also contribute to personal growth and resources. To better understand these product-related emotions, new theories and tools are needed to describe and measure the concerns and appraisals that differentiate positive emotions in human-product relationships. Additionally, it is important to examine how these emotions influence consumer behavior and product experiences.

Further supporting this view, a 2018 study on hedonic asymmetry in consumer satisfaction challenges the traditional notion that displeasure lingers longer than pleasure. Drawing on Frijda’s original formulation, the study found that positive emotions have a stronger influence on satisfaction than negative ones, especially in the context of low-involvement products like coffee. These products, despite their everyday nature, often deliver emotionally gratifying experiences through favorable situational factors, such as a relaxing break or social interaction. The findings reveal that the emotional payoff from low-cost, routine items can sometimes surpass that of high-involvement products like wine. While negative emotions still reduce satisfaction, they are more stable and less sensitive to context. This suggests a revised interpretation of hedonic asymmetry in consumer behavior: in many product consumption contexts, positive emotions not only dominate but also drive satisfaction more effectively than negative ones.

== Contextual modulation of hedonic asymmetry ==
Recent studies have challenged the traditional interpretation of hedonic asymmetry by examining how context and product involvement affect emotional responses during consumption. While the theory originally posited that negative emotions are more persistent than positive ones, empirical findings in consumer psychology reveal that this asymmetry may be reversed in specific settings, particularly with low-involvement products.

A 2018 study using Structural Equation Modeling explored how emotions influence satisfaction across high and low involvement products—wine and coffee, respectively. The results showed that positive emotions exert a stronger influence on satisfaction for low-involvement products, suggesting that situational and contextual factors, such as the occasion or setting of consumption, can amplify the emotional value of everyday goods. Negative emotions, although present, displayed a more consistent effect regardless of product type. These findings indicate that product involvement moderates the impact of positive emotions, highlighting the importance of context in understanding how hedonic asymmetry operates in consumer experiences. This nuanced view emphasizes that, under certain conditions, pleasure can be both enduring and central to satisfaction, challenging the conventional dominance of negative affect in hedonic theory.

== See also ==
- Negativity bias
- Hedonic treadmill
- Positive psychology
- Emotion regulation
- Approach–avoidance conflict
- Affective forecasting
- Consumer behavior
