= Interpersonal emotion regulation =

Process of changing the emotional experience of oneself or another's through interaction

Interpersonal emotion regulation is the process of changing the emotional experience of one's self or another person through social interaction. It encompasses both intrinsic emotion regulation (also known as emotional self-regulation), in which one attempts to alter their own feelings by recruiting social resources, as well as extrinsic emotion regulation, in which one deliberately attempts to alter the trajectory of other people's feelings.

== History of concept ==
The concept of interpersonal emotion regulation stems from earlier research into emotional self-regulation, which is the within-person process whereby people influence and change their own feelings. The field of psychology has traditionally focused on intrapersonal processes in which a person manages their own emotions individually outside of the social context. However, modern theories have expanded the concept of emotion regulation to include interpersonal processes, in which emotion is regulated with or through other people. Interpersonal models emphasize that humans are social creatures who rarely experience emotions in isolation, and instead more commonly share, express, and manage their emotions with the help of others.

== Concept ==
=== Intrinsic interpersonal emotion regulation ===
Intrinsic interpersonal emotion regulation involves managing one's own emotions through social interaction, such as seeking social support or reassurance from others. Examples include calling a friend for advice, venting to a partner about a stressful situation, or engaging in conversation as a distraction from distress. In addition to regulating negative emotions, people also seek to amplify positive emotions by sharing good news with others. As with intrapersonal emotion regulation, people typically attempt to use interpersonal emotion regulation to improve their affective state by decreasing negative emotions or increase positive emotions.

=== Extrinsic interpersonal emotion regulation ===
Extrinsic interpersonal emotion regulation refers to the deliberate influence of others' feelings. It is one of the many ways how social factors influence an individual's emotions. Examples include trying to cheer up a friend who is upset, trying to make one's partner feel guilty for neglecting oneself, or trying to calm a stressed coworker. These examples illustrate that interpersonal emotion regulation may be used to make others feel better or worse, although making others feel better appears to be far more common.

=== In groups ===
Many instances of interpersonal emotion regulation, such as those described above, are dyadic; in other words, they involve one person trying to influence the feelings of another person. However, interpersonal emotion regulation can occur between larger social groups. For example, in the workplace a leader might try to influence the feelings of a whole group of followers to make them feel more enthusiastic and motivated. Or in support groups, the whole group might work together to influence the feelings of a member to make the member feel less anxious or depressed.

Interpersonal emotion regulation is used in most of the important social relationships that we have. Within the fields of developmental and clinical psychology, researchers have long-recognized that people try to influence others' emotions (e.g., mothers influence the feelings of their babies, therapists try to alleviate the sadness of their clients). More recently, social and organizational psychologists have also documented the use of interpersonal emotion regulation within romantic and familial relationships and in a range of work settings (e.g., hospitals, law firms, debt collection agencies, and prisons). Interpersonal emotion regulation may even be used towards complete strangers as a way of making social interactions run more smoothly.

=== Related processes ===
Interpersonal emotion regulation overlaps with social support, which involves giving others emotional, informational, or practical support. Models of interpersonal emotion regulation specify social support within the framework of regulatory goals to improve the feelings of one's self (by seeking support) or another person (by providing support). Emotion regulation mechanisms of social support include attentional deployment (e.g. distraction away from negative thoughts and toward the conversation) and cognitive change (e.g. encouragement to "look on the bright side" or change one's negative interpretation of a given situation).

Interpersonal emotion regulation also shares links with other processes by which people come to influence others' emotions, such as emotional contagion, in which the emotions of one person are 'caught' by another person as a result of mere contact (e.g., if someone was having a terrible day, they might 'infect' their friends with their bad mood). Similarly, the compulsion to tell other people about our emotional experiences (termed the social sharing of emotions) can also result in other people coming to feel what we feel. The difference between these processes and interpersonal emotion regulation regards the level of processing involved. Interpersonal emotion regulation is a controlled process, whereby a person intentionally tries to change the way others feel. In contrast, emotional contagion is thought to be relatively automatic, engaged without conscious awareness, while social sharing is somewhat more conscious but typically lacks the intent to influence others' emotions.

Interpersonal emotion regulation relates to emotional labor, the regulation of emotion as part of one's job role. In emotional labor, an employee (usually in a service or care role) is required to manage his or her emotions as part of the job (e.g., 'service with a smile'). Because employees can also be required to manage the emotions of their customers or clients as part of their job (e.g., debt collectors are required to elicit anxiety in relaxed debtors to encourage them to make a payment), interpersonal emotion regulation can be performed as a form of emotional labor.

Another related process is interpersonal influence, which involves trying to change the attitudes and/or behaviors of other people. The key difference here is that interpersonal emotion regulation is primarily concerned with changing other people's feelings; any changes to attitudes or behaviors are secondary to the impact on emotion.

== Theories ==
=== Social baseline theory ===
Drawing from behavioral ecology, Jim Coan's social baseline theory purports that humans have adapted to function in a social environment. The brain acts under the assumption that proximity to other people is the norm, or baseline condition. As opposed to social isolation, which is associated with stress and poor health, social proximity is associated with attenuated cardiovascular, hormonal, and neural responses to threat, as well as longevity and physical health. The presence of others is theorized to help individuals conserve effort and metabolic resources through the social regulation of emotion.

For example, the dorsolateral prefrontal cortex is less active during the down-regulation of negative affect while the presence of others. Social proximity is hypothesized to confer emotion regulatory benefits through three mechanisms: 1) risk distribution, 2) load sharing, and 3) capitalization. Risk distribution lowers vigilance towards threat because risks seem lower as group size increases. Load sharing involves the knowledge that close others can provide help and resources if needed. Finally, capitalization refers to the intensification of positive emotions when they are shared with others.

=== Map of interpersonal regulation ===
A prominent model proposed by Jamil Zaki and Craig Williams (2013) conceptualizes different classes of interpersonal emotion regulation along two orthogonal dimensions. The first, intrinsic vs extrinsic, refers to the target of regulatory efforts. Intrinsic regulation involves an attempt to change one's own emotions through social contact, while extrinsic regulation involves trying to change the emotions of another person or group of people. The second dimension, response-dependent vs. response-independent, refers to whether or not the regulatory efforts depend upon the behavior of other people. Processes that rely upon how others respond or behave are considered response-dependent, while strategies that do not depend upon others' behavior are classified as response-independent. This model yields four classes of interpersonal emotion regulation:

1. Intrinsic response-dependent: An individual tries to change their own affect through interaction with another person, whose feedback impacts the regulatory attempt. Safety behaviors fall into this category. For example, to alleviate anxiety a child might seek comfort from his mother, who responds in a soothing manner. Some forms of social sharing can also be considered an intrinsic response-dependent strategy, insofar as the listener's feedback influences the speaker's affect. For instance, sharing good news can intensify one's positive affect, but only if the listener responds enthusiastically.
2. Intrinsic response-independent: Processes in this category involve attempts to alter one's own emotional experience through social contact, but the regulatory success does not depend upon how others react or behave. Affect labeling, or putting feelings into words, can dampen the intensity of emotional experience and commonly occurs during communication in social contexts without necessarily relying on the response of others. For instance, describing one's emotions through a conversation may result in a more nuanced understanding of one's feelings that facilitates coping.
3. Extrinsic response-dependent: A person acts with the goal of changing another person's emotion, whose feedback plays an important role in indicating the success of the regulatory attempt. Examples include prosocial behavior and related processes such as empathic responding that endeavor to improve other people's affective state. Feedback from the recipient is needed to signal whether or not they were helped.
4. Extrinsic response-independent: This classification includes attempts to change another person's affective experience that do not depend upon that person's feedback. For example, warm glow giving may result in the achieved extrinsic goal of engaging in prosocial behavior without receiving cues from the recipient as to whether or not they benefitted.

== Strategies ==
There are potentially hundreds of strategies that people can use to influence others' feelings. A series of studies reported by Niven and colleagues generated almost 400 unique strategies that could be differentiated primarily according to whether they are used to improve or to worsen others' feelings. Another key distinction is between strategies that engage a person in the specific situation that has caused the emotion (e.g., trying to get the person to see a situation in a different light) and those that divert attention away (e.g., joking with the person).

Research based on Niven and colleagues' classification has indicated that these distinct strategy types have different effects on the well-being of the people who use them and also on the people who they are used towards. They may even have different implications for the quality of the relationship between these two parties.

A different way of distinguishing interpersonal emotion regulation strategies is according to the stage of the emotion that they focus on. Inspired by James Gross's process model of emotion, some researchers have suggested that there is a difference between strategies that try to change the underlying emotion someone is feeling and strategies that try to change the emotion that the person expresses outwardly.

== In psychopathology ==
Patterns of interpersonal emotion dysregulation may contribute to the onset and maintenance of mental health disorders.

=== Anxiety disorders ===
Anxiety disorders are perpetuated by avoidance of feared stimuli. Avoidance behaviors can include the presence of "safety people", who reduce the anxious individual's distress while negatively reinforcing the avoidance. For example, an individual with panic disorder may ask her partner to drive her to work, which alleviates her fear of having a panic attack while driving. This pattern may lead to reliance upon others and contribute to continued avoidance (e.g. of driving a car alone). Another interpersonal strategy used in anxiety disorders is reassurance seeking. For example, someone with obsessive compulsive disorder may rely upon a roommate to assure them that the doors have been locked, or an individual with generalized anxiety disorder may ask a romantic partner for reassurances of love.

=== Depression ===
Individuals with depression experience maladaptive interpersonal interactions, which contribute to their depressive symptoms. These behaviors include greater expressed negativity (e.g. criticism, blaming, demanding, and disengagement) toward romantic partners, and negative feedback seeking. Excessive reassurance seeking is also a vulnerability factor for depression. However, Marroquin (2011) proposes adaptive interpersonal emotion regulation as a mechanism of the positive effects of social support. Social interaction that diverts attention away from self-referential negative thinking and promotes cognitive reappraisal may help to alleviate depression.

=== Borderline personality disorder ===
According to the biosocial model, individuals with borderline personality disorder develop intense emotional expression in part because they have been reinforced throughout development. For instance, a teenager with heightened emotional sensitivity is not taken seriously by her family until she threatens a suicide attempt. If her family responds with attention to extreme emotional expressions, she will learn to continue to express emotions in this way. Venting is another interpersonal emotion regulation strategy that is associated with personality disorder symptoms.

=== Psychotherapy ===
Certain types of psychotherapy target interpersonal factors to improve well-being. Dialectical behavioral therapy, originally developed for individuals with borderline personality disorder, teaches clients interpersonal effectiveness, which includes a variety of skills for communicating emotions in a clear and socially acceptable manner. Assertiveness training is a behavioral intervention that teaches verbal and non-verbal assertiveness skills to inhibit anxiety.

== Assessment measures ==
Several questionnaires have been developed to measure people's self-reported use of interpersonal emotion regulation, including the Emotion Regulation of Others and Self (EROS), Interpersonal Emotion Regulation Questionnaire (IERQ), Interpersonal Regulation Questionnaire (IRQ), and the Difficulties in Interpersonal Regulation of Emotion (DIRE).

=== Emotion Regulation of Others and Self ===
The Emotion Regulation of Others and Self (EROS) questionnaire is a freely available measure that assess strategies used to improve or worsen either one's own or another person's emotions, yielding a two-by-two framework: 1) intrinsic affect-improving, 2) intrinsic affect-worsening, 3) extrinsic affect-improving, and 4) extrinsic affect-worsening. The intrinsic subscale measures emotion self-regulation using 10 items. The extrinsic subscale measures deliberate attempts to improve or worsen others' emotions using 9 items. There is low item endorsement for the affect-worsening dimension, suggesting that people rarely make deliberate attempts to worsen their own or others' emotions.

However, extrinsic affect-worsening is associated with health-related impairments, suggesting detrimental effects of engaging in these strategies likely due to negative social repercussions. Additionally, the affect-improving factor is unrelated to current levels of affect, which may be attributed to the scale's psychometric properties or to a discrepancy between current mood state and strategy use (e.g., reporting use of affect-improving strategies more often while in a negative mood state).

=== Interpersonal Emotion Regulation Questionnaire ===
The Interpersonal Emotion Regulation Questionnaire (IERQ) is a 20-item measure designed to assess how individuals regulate their own emotions through the use of others. The questionnaire was developed through qualitative interviews with participants (e.g., "When you are feeling down, in what ways do you look to other people to help you feel better?"), whose responses were quantitatively tested using exploratory and confirmatory factor analysis to derive 4 factors containing 5 items each. The 4 factors include Enhancing Positive Affect (seeking social interaction to enhance happiness), Perspective Taking (recruiting others to point out that other people are in a worse situation), Soothing (seeking comfort and sympathy from others), and Social Modeling (observing others for examples of how to cope). Is a freely available measure

=== Interpersonal Regulation Questionnaire ===
The Interpersonal Regulation Questionnaire (IRQ) is a 16-item measure of intrinsic interpersonal emotion regulation that assesses individuals' tendency to recruit social resources in response to emotional events, as well as their perceived efficacy of how effective interpersonal strategies are in improving their emotional experiences. Because it is a less common for individuals to deliberately worsen their mood, the measure focuses on increasing positive emotions and decreasing negative emotions. High interpersonal emotion regulation tendency and efficacy is related to greater emotional expressivity, empathy, social connectedness, and supportive relationships. Individuals who score high on efficacy are more likely to benefit from social support.

=== Difficulties in Interpersonal Regulation of Emotion ===
The Difficulties in Interpersonal Regulation of Emotion (DIRE) is a self-report measure of maladaptive interpersonal emotion regulation strategies that may relate to psychopathology. Respondents rate how likely they would be to use a variety of strategies in response to three vignettes about stressful hypothetical scenarios (task-oriented, romantic, social). The DIRS consists of four factors, including two intrapersonal (Accept, Avoid) and two interpersonal (Reassurance-seek, Vent) classes of strategies. Reassurance-seeking is related to overall emotion dysregulation, as well as depression and anxiety symptoms. Both reassurance-seeking and venting are associated with negative affect, interpersonal problems, stress, and borderline personality disorder symptoms.

== See also ==
- Emotional self-regulation
- Social support
- Social connection
- Co-regulation
- Emotion work
