= Affect regulation =

Concept in psychology

Affect regulation and "affect regulation theory" are important concepts in psychiatry and psychology and in close relation with emotion regulation. However, the latter is a reflection of an individual's mood status rather than their affect. Affect regulation is the actual performance one can demonstrate in a difficult situation regardless of what their mood or emotions are. It is tightly related to the quality of executive and cognitive functions and that is what distinguishes this concept from emotion regulation. One can have a low emotional control but a high level of control on his or her affect, and therefore, demonstrate a normal interpersonal functioning as a result of intact cognition.

== Theoretical frameworks and background ==
Since the late 19th century, several of psychology's most significant researchers have incorporated the idea of emotional control into psychological thought. The influential William James studied how a person's physiological responses impact their emotional experiences, suggesting a need for a regulation of these responses.

Sigmund Freud's psychoanalytical research led to the introduction of 'defence mechanisms', cognitive responses which serve to push unwanted thoughts and emotions out of the conscious mind. This, too, seemed to suggest that people hold some sort of ability to regulate their experience of their emotions.

In his studies of the human psyche, Carl Jung looked into how people manage their emotions by integrating some into their personality and suppressing others, which in turn gives us our "personas" through self-awareness.

As cognitive psychology developed in the 20th century, so did research into emotional control, with it being believed that cognitive processes can enable affect regulation. This period saw techniques like 'coping strategies' come into the public eye as a result, as a means of managing certain medical problems, particularly those with cardiac origins.

In the late 20th century, Richard S. Lazarus brought to light the theory of cognitive appraisal (an individual's subjective view of their environment and its stimuli) in understanding emotional responses, while James J. Gross introduced the Process Model of Emotion Regulation, further investigating how individuals are able to influence their own experience of their emotions through reframing situations and selectively deploying attention in order to reduce feelings of anxiety.

== Strategies in Affect Regulation ==
Affect regulation is carried out in a number of ways. The strategy of cognitive reappraisal has been heavily investigated, referring to the ability of an individual to alter their interpretation of a situation or event which is likely to elicit negative feelings in order to reduce or redirect its psychological impact. This is referred to as an antecedent-focused regulation as it is focused on changing the affect experienced before the emotion has developed. This can be used to reduce feelings of anxiety when facing potentially daunting events.

Another well-studied strategy for the regulation of emotions is suppression, referring to the outward inhibition of an emotional response. Contrary to cognitive reappraisal, this a response-focused strategy, meaning it occurs after the inner emotion has arisen. In short, this is when one attempts to hide their inner emotions from being outwardly expressed. While suppression is socially important, recent research has connected extended emotional suppression to increases in mortality risk, particularly from cardiovascular diseases, with some connection even being made with increased cancer mortality.

== Mechanisms in Affect Regulation ==
Neurologically, affect regulation can be localised in the prefrontal cortex, the area responsible for emotion management. The prefrontal cortex aids the control of the limbic system which is the home of the amygdala, the part of the brain which is believed to be central to the processing of our emotions. This theory has been challenged, though, due to there being limited research on the amygdala's effect on broad emotional responses. More recent research has pointed to the dynamic nature of the amygdala, suggesting that people are able to regulate their emotions and responses based on the present situation and their own individual objectives (interplay between cognitive and emotional processes).

In developmental psychology, one's affect regulation is seen to be constantly evolving, starting in childhood. Caregivers are responsible for laying the foundations for appropriate emotional responses. As children grow older, their ability to self-regulate their emotions becomes more refined as a result of social learning, conditioning and cognitive development, with family effect being the largest contributor to this. It is also believed that this process is critical in children, with dysfunctional affect regulation practices in childhood being commonly associated with mental health problems such as depression or anxiety later in life.

== Cultural factors ==
Affect management can significantly vary between cultures, as shown in more recent cross-cultural studies such as Matsumoto, Yoo, and Fontaine's 2008 research. Different cultures hold their own norms about emotional expressions, influencing the strategies of affect management people use. Many cultures, particularly those seen to be collectivist, advocate for emotional restraint, while individualistic cultures will be accepting of the open expression of emotion. People living in these two variations of culture will regulate and therefore display their emotions in dramatically different ways.

== Practical applications and implications ==
Emotion Regulation Treatment (ERT) has been utilised in the development of therapeutic practices, with recent trials being carried for Affect Regulation Treatment (ART), as a distinctive practice. Helping patients master emotion and affect regulation techniques has been seen as valuable in treating mental health issues like PTSD, anxiety and depression. Teaching these techniques can help people with these issues manage their emotions more effectively, helping them experience higher levels of day-to-day wellbeing.

Outside of treatment, one's level of affect regulation is vital in determining their emotional intelligence. This, in turn, is crucial to the construction and maintenance of a person's relationships. People with high emotional intelligence are believed to be far better equipped in dealing with conflicts, developing stronger relationships with others and are believed to hold higher levels of empathy than the average person.

In the education sector, the incorporation of affect regulation has been shown to effectively supplement student learning. Through teaching young students the tools to manage their emotions, schools can promote empathy and determination as the foundation of their pupils' success. Pupils from schools which have incorporated Social and Emotional Learning (SEL) have been shown to have improved social and emotional skills, as well as boosted academic performance. Due to the culturally relative nature of affect regulation, it is important that it is ethically integrated into schools so as not to challenge the norms or values of varying cultures.

== See also ==
- Affect (psychology)
- Affect theory
- Affective
- Affective spectrum
- Emotional self-regulation
- Emotional intelligence
