= Emotional self-regulation =

Concept in psychology

The self-regulation of emotion or emotion regulation is the ability to respond to the ongoing experience with the range of emotions in a manner that is socially tolerable and sufficiently flexible to permit spontaneous reactions as well as the ability to delay spontaneous reactions as needed. It can also be defined as extrinsic and intrinsic processes responsible for monitoring, evaluating, and modifying emotional reactions. The self-regulation of emotion belongs to the broader set of emotion regulation processes, which includes both the regulation of one's own feelings and the regulation of other people's feelings.

Emotion regulation is a complex process that involves initiating, inhibiting, or modulating one's state or behavior in a given situation — for example, the subjective experience (feelings), cognitive responses (thoughts and mental processes), emotion-related physiological responses (for example heart rate or hormonal activity), and emotion-related behavior (bodily actions or expressions). Functionally, emotion regulation can also refer to processes such as the tendency to focus one's attention to a task and the ability to suppress inappropriate behavior under instruction. Emotion regulation is an important function in human life.

People are continually exposed to a wide range of potentially arousing stimuli. Inappropriate, extreme or unchecked emotional reactions to such stimuli could impede functional fit within society; therefore, people must engage in some form of emotion regulation almost all of the time. Generally speaking, emotion dysregulation has been defined as difficulties in controlling the influence of emotional arousal on the organization and quality of thoughts, actions, and interactions. Individuals who are emotionally dysregulated exhibit patterns of responding in which there is a mismatch between their goals, responses, and/or modes of expression, and the demands of the social environment. For example, there is a significant association between emotion dysregulation and symptoms of ADHD, depression, anxiety, eating pathology, and substance abuse. Individuals diagnosed with mood disorders and anxiety disorders also experience dysfunction in the automatic regulation of emotions, further impacting their emotion regulation abilities. Higher levels of emotion regulation are likely to be related to both high levels of social competence and the expression of socially appropriate emotions.

== Theory ==
=== Process model ===
The process model of emotion regulation is based upon the modal model of emotion. The modal model of emotion suggests that the emotion generation process occurs in a particular sequence over time. This sequence occurs as follows:

1. Situation: the sequence begins with a situation (real or imagined) that is emotionally relevant.
2. Attention: attention is directed towards the emotional situation.
3. Appraisal: the emotional situation is evaluated and interpreted.
4. Response: an emotional response is generated, giving rise to loosely coordinated changes in experiential, behavioral, and physiological response systems.

Because an emotional response (4.) can cause changes to a situation (1.), this model involves a feedback loop from (4.) Response to (1.) Situation. This feedback loop suggests that the emotion generation process can occur recursively, is ongoing, and dynamic.

The process model contends that each of these four points in the emotion generation process can be subjected to regulation. From this conceptualization, the process model posits five different families of emotion regulation that correspond to the regulation of a particular point in the emotion generation process. They occur in the following order:

1. Situation selection
2. Situation modification
3. Attentional deployment
4. Cognitive change
5. Response modulation

The process model also divides these emotion regulation strategies into two categories: antecedent-focused and response-focused. Antecedent-focused strategies (i.e., situation selection, situation modification, attentional deployment, and cognitive change) occur before an emotional response is fully generated. Response-focused strategies (i.e., response modulation) occur after an emotional response is fully generated.

==== MCCE Model (Model of the Cognitive Control of Emotion) ====
The Model of the Cognitive Control of Emotion (MCCE), developed by Kevin Ochsner, depicts how various emotion regulation strategies intervene at specific points along the emotion-generation process. The model traces a sequence beginning with a stimulus encountered in context, whether internal (thoughts, sensations) or external (people, actions, events), which is then processed through stages of attention, appraisal, and response, ultimately producing experiential, behavioral, and physiological outcomes.

Cognitive control processes act on this sequence at five distinct points. Situation selection and situation modification intervene before the stimulus is even fully processed, shaping which stimuli a person encounters or how the situation itself is altered. Attentional deployment governs where attention is directed toward a stimulus or its particular attribute, while cognitive change, most prominently through reappraisal, shifts the appraisal stage by reinterpreting the emotional significance of the situation in either an aversive or appetitive direction. Finally, response modulation acts after the emotional response has already been generated, directly influencing experience, behavior, or physiology.

Empirically, Ochsner's work demonstrated that engaging these regulatory strategies activates the prefrontal cortex (PFC), which in turn modulates amygdala activity, decreasing it during downregulation of negative emotion and increasing it during upregulation. This finding established that cognitive control operates through a top-down PFC-to-amygdala pathway rather than through changes in the stimulus itself. The MCCE model therefore provides a structural map for identifying precisely where in the emotion-generation timeline a given regulatory strategy exerts its effect, and which underlying brain regions support that intervention.

== Strategies ==
=== Situation selection ===
Situation selection is an emotional regulation strategy that involves choosing to avoid or approach a future emotional situation. If a person selects to avoid or disengage from an emotionally relevant situation, they are decreasing the likelihood of experiencing an emotion. Alternatively, if a person selects to approach or engage with an emotionally relevant situation, they are increasing the likelihood of experiencing an emotion.

Typical examples of situation selection may be seen interpersonally, such as when a parent removes his or her child from an emotionally unpleasant situation. Use of situation selection may also be seen in psychopathology. For example, avoidance of social situations to regulate emotions is particularly pronounced for those with social anxiety disorder and avoidant personality disorder.

Effective situation selection is not always an easy task. For instance, humans display difficulties predicting their emotional responses to future events. Therefore, they may have trouble making accurate and appropriate decisions about which emotionally relevant situations to approach or to avoid.

=== Situation modification ===
Situation modification involves efforts to modify a situation so as to change its emotional impact. Situation modification refers specifically to altering one's external, physical environment. Altering one's "internal" environment to regulate emotion is called cognitive change. Younger and older adults seem to also regulate their emotions through situation modification in differing ways that reflects what type of material they consume ranging from negative, neutral, and positive. Livingstone and Isaacowitz conducted research where they observed younger and older adults as they viewed different types of material and had the choice to skip what material they saw, and it came out that older adults are better able to regulate the negative material, focusing mainly on the positive, than the younger adults who still consumed positive material, but not as much modification. This demonstrated that as we age, we gain a better understanding of situation modification and being able to emotionally self-regulate. Beyond individual situational strategies, structured psychotherapeutic approaches such as cognitive behavioral therapy (CBT) have demonstrated effectiveness in improving emotion regulation by targeting maladaptive cognitive patterns and enhancing coping skills.

Examples of situation modification may include injecting humor into a speech to elicit laughter or extending the physical distance between oneself and another person.

=== Attentional deployment ===
Attentional deployment involves directing one's attention towards or away from an emotional situation.

==== Distraction ====
Distraction, an example of attentional deployment, is an early selection strategy, which involves diverting one's attention away from an emotional stimulus and towards other content. Distraction has been shown to reduce the intensity of painful and emotional experiences, to decrease facial responding and neural activation in the amygdala associated with emotion, as well as to alleviate emotional distress. As opposed to reappraisal, individuals show a relative preference to engage in distraction when facing stimuli of high negative emotional intensity. This is because distraction easily filters out high-intensity emotional content, which would otherwise be relatively difficult to appraise and process.

==== Rumination ====
Rumination, an example of attentional deployment, is defined as the passive and repetitive focusing of one's attention on one's symptoms of distress and the causes and consequences of these symptoms. Rumination is generally considered a maladaptive emotion regulation strategy, as it tends to exacerbate emotional distress. It has also been implicated in a host of disorders including major depression.

==== Worry ====
Worry, an example of attentional deployment, involves directing attention to thoughts and images concerned with potentially negative events in the future. By focusing on these events, worrying serves to aid in the down-regulation of intense negative emotion and physiological activity. While worry may sometimes involve problem solving, incessant worry is generally considered maladaptive, being a common feature of anxiety disorders, particularly generalized anxiety disorder.

==== Thought suppression ====
Thought suppression, an example of attentional deployment, involves efforts to redirect one's attention from specific thoughts and mental images to other content so as to modify one's emotional state. Although thought suppression may provide temporary relief from undesirable thoughts, it may ironically end up spurring the production of even more unwanted thoughts. This strategy is generally considered maladaptive, being most associated with obsessive-compulsive disorder.

=== Cognitive change ===
Cognitive change involves changing how one appraises a situation so as to alter its emotional meaning.

==== Reappraisal ====
Reappraisal, an example of cognitive change, is a late selection strategy, which involves a change of the meaning of an event that alters its emotional impact. It encompasses different substrategies, such as positive reappraisal (creating and focusing on a positive aspect of the stimulus), decentering (reinterpreting an event by broadening one's perspective to see "the bigger picture"), or fictional reappraisal (adopting or emphasizing the belief that event is not real, that it is for instance "just a movie" or "just my imagination"). Reappraisal has been shown to effectively reduce physiological, subjective, and neural emotional responding. As opposed to distraction, individuals show a relative preference to engage in reappraisal when facing stimuli of low negative emotional intensity because these stimuli are relatively easy to appraise and process.

Reappraisal is generally considered to be an adaptive emotion regulation strategy. Compared to suppression (including both thought suppression and expressive suppression), which is positively correlated with many psychological disorders, reappraisal can be associated with better interpersonal outcomes, and can be positively related to well-being. However, some researchers argue that context is important when evaluating the adaptiveness of a strategy, suggesting that in some contexts reappraisal may be maladaptive. Furthermore, some research has shown reappraisal does not influence or affect physiological responses to recurrent stress.

==== Distancing ====
Distancing, an example of cognitive change, involves taking on an independent, third-person perspective when evaluating an emotional event. Distancing has been shown to be an adaptive form of self-reflection, facilitating the emotional processing of negatively valenced stimuli, reducing emotional and cardiovascular reactivity to negative stimuli, and increasing problem-solving behavior.

==== Humour ====
Humour, an example of cognitive change, has been shown to be an effective emotion regulation strategy. Specifically, positive, good-natured humour has been shown to effectively up-regulate positive emotion and down-regulate negative emotion. On the other hand, negative, mean-spirited humour is less effective in this regard.

=== Response modulation ===
Response modulation involves attempts to directly influence experiential, behavioral, and physiological response systems.

==== Expressive suppression ====
Expressive suppression, an example of response modulation, involves inhibiting emotional expressions. It has been shown to effectively reduce facial expressivity, subjective feelings of positive emotion, heart rate, and sympathetic activation. However, the research findings are mixed regarding whether this strategy is effective for down-regulating negative emotion. Research has also shown that expressive suppression may have negative social consequences, correlating with reduced personal connections and greater difficulties forming relationships.

Expressive suppression is generally considered to be a maladaptive emotion regulation strategy. Compared to reappraisal, it is positively correlated with many psychological disorders, associated with worse interpersonal outcomes, is negatively related to well-being, and requires the mobilization of a relatively substantial amount of cognitive resources. However, some researchers argue that context is important when evaluating the adaptiveness of a strategy, suggesting that in some contexts suppression may be adaptive.

==== Drug use ====
Drug use, an example of response modulation, can be used to alter emotion-associated physiological responses. For example, alcohol can produce sedative and anxiolytic effects and beta blockers can affect sympathetic activation.

==== Exercise ====
Exercise, an example of response modulation, can be used to down-regulate the physiological and experiential effects of negative emotions. Regular physical activity has also been shown to reduce emotional distress and improve emotional control. Exercise has been proven to increase emotional health and regulation through hormonal regulation.

==== Sleep ====
Sleep plays a role in emotion regulation, although stress and worry can also interfere with sleep. Studies have shown that sleep, specifically REM sleep, down-regulates reactivity of the amygdala, a brain structure known to be involved in the processing of emotions, in response to previous emotional experiences. On the flip side, sleep deprivation is associated with greater emotional reactivity or overreaction to negative and stressful stimuli. This is a result of both increased amygdala activity and a disconnect between the amygdala and the prefrontal cortex, which regulates the amygdala through inhibition, together resulting in an overactive emotional brain. Due to the subsequent lack of emotional control, sleep deprivation may be associated with depression, impulsivity, and mood swings. Additionally, there is some evidence that sleep deprivation may reduce emotional reactivity to positive stimuli and events and impair emotion recognition in others.

==== Borderline Personality Disorder (BPD) ====
In its extreme form, problems with response modulation is correlated with Borderline Personality Disorder (BPD). BPD is characterized by an enduring instability in regulating emotions, relationships with others, the affected person's self-image, and their behavior. This can lead to self-sabotage, risk-taking, impulsivity, and aggression. Research has indicated that the heightened emotional response can be due to an exaggerated amygdala response and an impaired anterior cingulate cortex, which is responsible for modulating emotions. This can lead to an intense emotional response.

== In psychotherapy ==
Emotion regulation strategies are taught, and emotion regulation problems are treated, in a variety of counseling and psychotherapy approaches, including cognitive behavioral therapy (CBT), dialectical behavior therapy (DBT), emotion-focused therapy (EFT), and mindfulness-based cognitive therapy (MBCT).

For example, a relevant mnemonic formulated in DBT is "ABC PLEASE":

- Accumulate positive experiences.
- Build mastery by being active in activities that make one feel competent and effective to combat helplessness.
- Cope ahead, preparing an action plan, researching, and rehearsing (with a skilled helper if necessary).
- Physical illness treatment and prevention through checkups.
- Low vulnerability to diseases, managed with health care professionals.
- Eating healthy.
- Avoiding (non-prescribed) mood-altering drugs.
- Sleep healthy.
- Exercise regularly.

== Developmental process ==
=== Infancy ===
Intrinsic emotion regulation efforts during infancy are believed to be guided primarily by innate physiological response systems. These systems usually manifest as an approach towards and an avoidance of pleasant or unpleasant stimuli. At three months, infants can engage in self-soothing behaviors like sucking and can reflexively respond to and signal feelings of distress. For instance, infants have been observed attempting to suppress anger or sadness by knitting their brow or compressing their lips.

Between three and six months, basic motor functioning and attentional mechanisms begin to play a role in emotion regulation, allowing infants to more effectively approach or avoid emotionally relevant situations. Infants may also engage in self-distraction and help-seeking behaviors for regulatory purposes. At one year, infants are able to navigate their surroundings more actively and respond to emotional stimuli with greater flexibility due to improved motor skills. They also begin to appreciate their caregivers' abilities to provide them regulatory support. For instance, infants generally have difficulties regulating fear. As a result, they often find ways to express fear in ways that attract the comfort and attention of caregivers.

Extrinsic emotion regulation efforts by caregivers, including situation selection, modification, and distraction, are particularly important for infants. The emotion regulation strategies employed by caregivers to attenuate distress or to up-regulate positive affect in infants can impact the infants' emotional and behavioral development, teaching them particular strategies and methods of regulation. The type of attachment style between caregiver and infant can therefore play a meaningful role in the regulatory strategies infants may learn to use.

Recent evidence supports the idea that maternal singing has a positive effect on affect regulation in infants. Singing play-songs can have a visible affect-regulatory consequence of prolonged positive affect and even alleviation of distress. In addition to proven facilitation of social bonding, when combined with movement and/or rhythmic touch, maternal singing for affect regulation has possible applications for infants in the NICU and for adult caregivers with serious personality or adjustment difficulties.

=== Toddler-hood ===
By the end of the first year, toddlers begin to adopt new strategies to decrease negative arousal. These strategies can include rocking themselves, chewing on objects, or moving away from things that upset them. At two years, toddlers become more capable of actively employing emotion regulation strategies. They can apply certain emotion regulation tactics to influence various emotional states. Additionally, maturation of brain functioning and language and motor skills permits toddlers to manage their emotional responses and levels of arousal more effectively.

Extrinsic emotion regulation remains important to emotional development in toddlerhood. Toddlers can learn ways from their caregivers to control their emotions and behaviors. For example, caregivers help teach self-regulation methods by distracting children from unpleasant events (like a vaccination shot) or helping them understand frightening events.

=== Childhood ===
Emotion regulation knowledge becomes more substantial during childhood. For example, children aged six to ten begin to understand display rules. They come to appreciate the contexts in which certain emotional expressions are socially most appropriate and therefore ought to be regulated. For example, children may understand that upon receiving a gift they should display a smile, irrespective of their actual feelings about the gift. During childhood, there is also a trend towards the use of more cognitive emotion regulation strategies, taking the place of more basic distraction, approach, and avoidance tactics.

Regarding the development of emotion dysregulation in children, one robust finding suggests that children who are frequently exposed to negative emotion at home will be more likely to display, and have difficulties regulating, high levels of negative emotion.

=== Adolescence ===
Adolescents show a marked increase in their capacities to regulate their emotions, and emotion regulation decision making becomes more complex, depending on multiple factors. In particular, the significance of interpersonal outcomes increases for adolescents. When regulating their emotions, adolescents are therefore likely to take into account their social context. For instance, adolescents show a tendency to display more emotion if they expect a sympathetic response from their peers.

Additionally, spontaneous use of cognitive emotion regulation strategies increases during adolescence, which is evidenced both by self-report data and neural markers.

=== Adulthood ===
Social losses increase and health tends to decrease as people age. As people get older their motivation to seek emotional meaning in life through social ties tends to increase. Autonomic responsiveness decreases with age, and emotion regulation skill tends to increase.

Emotional regulation in adulthood can also be examined in terms of positive and negative affectivity. Positive and negative affectivity refers to the types of emotions felt by an individual as well as the way those emotions are expressed. With adulthood comes an increased ability to maintain both high positive affectivity and low negative affectivity "more rapidly than adolescents." This response to life's challenges seems to become "automatized" as people progress throughout adulthood. Thus, as individuals age, their capability of self-regulating emotions and responding to their emotions in healthy ways improves.

Additionally, emotional regulation may vary between young adults and older adults. Younger adults have been found to be more successful than older adults in practicing "cognitive reappraisal" to decrease negative internal emotions. On the other hand, older adults have been found to be more successful in the following emotional regulation areas:

- Predicting the level of "emotional arousal" in possible situations
- Having a higher focus on positive information rather than negative
- Maintaining healthy levels of "hedonic well-being" (subjective well-being based on increased pleasure and decreased pain)

== Overview of perspectives ==
=== Neuropsychological perspective ===
==== Affective ====
As people age, their affect – the way they react to emotions – changes, either positively or negatively. Studies show that positive affect increases as a person grows from adolescence to their mid 70s. Negative affect, on the other hand, decreases until the mid 70s. Studies also show that emotions differ in adulthood, particularly affect (positive or negative). Although some studies found that individuals experience less affect as they grow older, other studies have concluded that adults in their middle age experience more positive affect and less negative affect than younger adults. Positive affect was also higher for men than women while the negative affect was higher for women than it was for men and also for single people.

A reason that older people – middle adulthood – might have less negative affect is because they have overcome, "the trials and vicissitudes of youth, they may increasingly experience a more pleasant balance of affect, at least up until their mid-70s". Positive affect might rise during middle age but towards the later years of life – the 70s – it begins to decline while negative affect also does the same. This might be due to failing health, reaching the end of their lives and the death of friends and relatives.

In addition to baseline levels of positive and negative affect, studies have found individual differences in the time-course of emotional responses to stimuli. The temporal dynamics of emotion regulation, also known as affective chronometry, include two key variables in the emotional response process: rise time to peak emotional response, and recovery time to baseline levels of emotion. Studies of affective chronometry typically separate positive and negative affect into distinct categories, as previous research has shown (despite some correlation) the ability of humans to experience changes in these categories independently of one another. Affective chronometry research has been conducted on clinical populations with anxiety, mood, and personality disorders, but is also utilized as a measurement to test the effectiveness of different therapeutic techniques (including mindfulness training) on emotional dysregulation.

==== Neurological ====
The development of functional magnetic resonance imaging has allowed for the study of emotion regulation on a biological level. Specifically, research over the last decade strongly suggests that there is a neural basis. Sufficient evidence has correlated emotion regulation to particular patterns of prefrontal activation. These regions include the orbital prefrontal cortex, the ventromedial prefrontal cortex, and the dorsolateral prefrontal cortex. Two additional brain structures that have been found to contribute are the amygdala and the anterior cingulate cortex. Each of these structures are involved in various facets of emotion regulation and irregularities in one or more regions and/or interconnections among them are affiliated with failures of emotion regulation. An implication to these findings is that individual differences in prefrontal activation predict the ability to perform various tasks in aspects of emotion regulation. As for the peripheral nervous system, studies showed that while some emotional markers, like electrodermal activity and facial electromyography, decrease during emotion regulation, cardiac activity seem to get higher, reflecting heart efforts allocated to control emotions.

=== Sociological ===
People intuitively mimic facial expressions; it is a fundamental part of healthy functioning. Similarities across cultures in regards to nonverbal communication has prompted the debate that it is in fact a universal language. It can be argued that emotion regulation plays a key role in the ability to generate the correct responses in social situations. Humans have control over facial expressions both consciously and unconsciously: an intrinsic emotion program is generated as the result of a transaction with the world, which immediately results in an emotional response and usually a facial reaction. It is a well documented phenomenon that emotions have an effect on facial expression, but recent research has provided evidence that the opposite may also be true.

This notion would give rise to the belief that a person may not only control his emotion but in fact influence them as well. Emotion regulation focuses on providing the appropriate emotion in the appropriate circumstances. Some theories allude to the thought that each emotion serves a specific purpose in coordinating organismic needs with environmental demands (Cole, 1994). This skill, although apparent throughout all nationalities, has been shown to vary in successful application at different age groups. In experiments done comparing younger and older adults to the same unpleasant stimuli, older adults were able to regulate their emotional reactions in a way that seemed to avoid negative confrontation. These findings support the theory that with time people develop a better ability to regulate their emotions. This ability found in adults seems to better allow individuals to react in what would be considered a more appropriate manner in some social situations, permitting them to avoid adverse situations that could be seen as detrimental.

==== Expressive regulation (in solitary conditions) ====
In solitary conditions, emotion regulation can include a minimization-miniaturization effect, in which common outward expressive patterns are replaced with toned down versions of expression. Unlike other situations, in which physical expression (and its regulation) serve a social purpose (i.e. conforming to display rules or revealing emotion to outsiders), solitary conditions require no reason for emotions to be outwardly expressed (although intense levels of emotion can bring out noticeable expression anyway). The idea behind this is that as people get older, they learn that the purpose of outward expression (to appeal to other people), is not necessary in situations in which there is no one to appeal to. As a result, the level of emotional expression can be lower in these solitary situations.

=== Stress ===
The way an individual reacts to stress can directly overlap with their ability to regulate emotion. Although the two concepts differ in a multitude of ways, "both coping [with stress] and emotion regulation involve affect modulation and appraisal processes" that are necessary for healthy relationships and self-identity.

According to Yu. V. Shcherbatykh, emotional stress in situations like school examinations can be reduced by engaging in self-regulating activities prior to the task being performed. To study the influence of self-regulation on mental and physiological processes under exam stress, Shcherbatykh conducted a test with an experimental group of 28 students (of both sexes) and a control group of 102 students (also of both sexes).

In the moments before the examination, situational stress levels were raised in both groups from what they were in quiet states. In the experimental group, participants engaged in three self-regulating techniques (concentration on respiration, general body relaxation, and the creation of a mental image of successfully passing the examination). During the examination, the anxiety levels of the experimental group were lower than that of the control group. Also, the percent of unsatisfactory marks in the experimental group was 1.7 times less than in the control group. From this data, Shcherbatykh concluded that the application of self-regulating actions before examinations helps to significantly reduce levels of emotional strain, which can help lead to better performance results.

Emotion regulation has also been associated with physiological responses to stress during laboratory stress paradigms.

=== Decision making ===
Identification of our emotional self-regulating process can facilitate in the decision-making process. Current literature on emotion regulation identifies that humans characteristically make efforts in controlling emotion experiences. There is then a possibility that our present state emotions can be altered by emotion regulation strategies resulting in the possibility that different regulation strategies could have different decision implications.

=== Digital emotion regulation ===
Following widespread adoption in the 21st century of digital devices and services for use in everyday life, evidence is mounting that people are increasingly using these tools to manage and regulate moods and emotions. A wide range of digital resources are used for emotion regulation including emotional AI, smartphones, social media, streaming services, online shopping, and videogames. Such spontaneous forms of digital emotion regulation can be distinguished from the use of digital interventions such as smartphone apps that have been explicitly designed to support emotional regulation or teach emotion regulation skills in clinical and non-clinical populations. Digital implementation of emotion regulation strategies can occur at all stages of the process model and in all strategy families, including interpersonal emotion regulation.

== Effects of low self-regulation ==
Issues with emotional regulation, a common consequence of Adverse Childhood Experiences (ACEs), have been shown to be a strong factor linking ACEs with psychological and physical dysfunctions in adulthood such as PTSD or depression.

A Ningxia University study on emotional regulation self-efficacy and impulsivity effects on risk-taking behaviour published in Frontiers in Psychology in 2025 defines emotional regulation self-efficacy as "an individual's confidence in their ability to regulate their own emotions, which primarily includes self-efficacy in regulating negative emotions and self-efficacy in regulating positive emotions."

High emotional regulation self-efficacy is associated with stronger domain-specific efficacy beliefs which in turn directly predict outcomes such as prosocial behaviour, delinquency and depression. Examples of domain-specific efficacy beliefs are academic self-efficacy (the ability to manage school work), resistive self-regulatory self-efficacy (resisting peer pressure towards anti-social acts) and empathic self-efficacy (engaging with others' feelings). This seems to suggest that emotional regulation self-efficacy enables effective self-regulation in other domains and thus, allows for more positive behaviours and outcomes as a downstream effect.

These traumatic experiences typically occur during grade school and are sometimes associated with bullying. Children who can't properly self-regulate express their volatile emotions in a variety of ways, including screaming if they don't have their way, lashing out with their fists, throwing objects (such as chairs), or bullying other children. These behaviours may elicit negative reactions from the social environment, which, in turn, can exacerbate or maintain the original regulation problems over time, a process termed cumulative continuity. These children are more likely to have conflict-based relationships with their teachers and other children. Early behaviour problems and negative teacher-child relationships in kindergarten predict more behavioural and academic difficulties through adolescence.

As most peers do not have low self-regulation, the children struggling may seem more conspicuous, and become excluded from social groups, teased or harassed by their peers. This atypical behaviour may result in teenagers becoming social outcasts in their respective social groups, causing them to lash out in angry and potentially violent ways. Childhood teasing, bullying or social exclusion can be especially damaging as it could lead to psychological symptoms such as depression and anxiety (in which dysregulated emotions play a central role), which, in turn, could lead to more peer victimization. This is why it is recommended to foster emotional self-regulation in children as early as possible.

== Occupational therapy in schools ==
Occupational therapists (OTs) are integrated educators in most public and private schools across the United States. They are trained in mental health and activity analysis to assess the needs of their clients. OTs and students work together to create meaningful and healthy habits for stress management, social skills, emotional labeling, coping strategies, awareness, problem-solving, self-monitoring, judgment, emotional control, and others in the school and home environment. OTs can complete formal assessments for emotional regulation and treat in a client-centered manner for each student. In addition, they can create individualized home programs for carryover with their families. For example, OTs can work with students to engage in the occupational therapist-developed curriculum The Zones of Regulation, which utilizes evidence-based knowledge, formal assessment, and in-classroom treatment to improve self-regulation of emotional behaviors and create long-lasting changes in habits.

Early childhood access to education on emotional regulation mitigates risk factors for increased anxiety, depression, and negative behaviors. It allows the student to create healthy habits for school and home environments. Children should be able to learn to regulate their feelings for full participation in activities, including social skills, play, sports, and school.

== See also ==
- Affect labeling
- Compassion
- Coping (psychology)
- Coping planning
- Distress tolerance
- Empathic concern
- Empathy
- Hedonic asymmetry
- Interpersonal emotion regulation
- Life skills
- Objectivity (philosophy)
- Rationality
- Self-control
- Self-regulation theory
- Social connection
- Social neuroscience
- Stress management
- Occupational therapy
