= Relationship science =

Field dedicated to the scientific study of interpersonal relationship processes

Relationship science is an interdisciplinary field dedicated to the scientific study of interpersonal relationship processes. Due to its interdisciplinary nature, relationship science is made up of researchers of various professional backgrounds within psychology (e.g., clinical, social, and developmental psychologists) and outside of psychology (e.g., anthropologists, sociologists, economists, and biologists), but most researchers who identify with the field are psychologists by training. Additionally, the field's emphasis has historically been close and intimate relationships, which includes predominantly dating and married couples, parent-child relationships, and friendships and social networks, but some also study less salient social relationships such as colleagues and acquaintances.

== History ==
=== Early 20th century ===
Empirically studying interpersonal relationships and social connection traces back to the early 20th century when some of the earliest focuses were on family relationships from a sociological perspective—specifically, marriage and parenting. In 1938 the National Council on Family Relations (NCFR) was formed and, in 1939, what is now the Journal of Marriage and Family (JMF) was established to publish peer-reviewed research with this emphasis. In the 1930s, 1940s, and 1950s, researchers such as John Bowlby, Harry Harlow, Robert Hinde, and Mary Ainsworth began pursuing the study of mother–infant attachment. In 1949, Reuben Hill developed the ABC-X model, which is a theoretical framework used to examine how families manage and adapt to crises given the resources they have. Then, in the late 1950s and early 1960s, the purview of relationship research began to expand more, beyond the idea of just family research. In 1959, Stanley Schachter published the book The Psychology of Affiliation: Experimental Studies of the Sources of Gregariousness, where he discussed humans' general affiliative needs and how they are intensified by biological responses (e.g., anxiety and hunger). That same year, Harold (Hal) Kelley and John Thibaut published a book, The Social Psychology of Groups, that outlined interdependence theory—an interdisciplinary theory that would become an essential framework for understanding close relationships from a cost-benefit perspective in the years to come. However, this prior interest in relationships was infrequent, and it was not until the late 1960s and early 1970s that the study of relationships truly began to blossom and gain popularity, which was in large part due to the influence of Ellen Berscheid and Elaine Hatfield.

=== 1960s to 2000s ===
Roughly two decades after the aforementioned work of Hill and a decade after the works of Schachter, Kelley, and Thibaut, Ellen Berscheid and Elaine Hatfield (professors at the Universities of Minnesota and Wisconsin, respectively) began studying how two individuals become attracted to one another. Yet, their work went beyond just attraction and began to explore other domains such as the processes of choosing a romantic partner and falling in love, and the centrality of relationships in human health and well-being. However, being a female professor and researcher during the era (when academia was overwhelmingly dominated by white males) was incredibly difficult, and was only made more difficult by the public reception to their phenomena of interest. In 1974, their work came under fire after the senator of Wisconsin at the time alleged their research was a waste of taxpayer dollars, in light of Berscheid receiving $84,000 from the National Science Foundation to study love. Despite this immense scrutiny, they nevertheless persisted in pioneering the nascent field of relationship science through the 1970s and into the 1980s through seminal developments such as the distinction between passionate and companionate love and a scale to measure the former. Meanwhile, researchers from across different disciplines had begun to dedicate themselves to the study of relationships.

Along with the fast growing interest came high-impact works. Urie Bronfenbrenner's late 1970s and mid-1980s social–ecological model established key principles that researchers would eventually use ubiquitously to study the impact of socio-contextual factors on relationships. Graham Spanier published the Dyadic Adjustment Scale (DAS) in JMF, which is currently the most widely cited scale of intimate relationship quality. John Bowlby's attachment theory, formalized in the late 1960s and early 1970s, laid the groundwork for the study of parent–child relationships and also helped shape the study of adult relationships in the field. Notably, in 1983, Harold Kelley, Ellen Berscheid, Andrew Christensen, Anne Peplau and their colleagues wrote the book Close Relationships, which provided a comprehensive overview of the field of relationship science in its early stages, and identified the typologies of relationships studied. Also in the 1980s and into the 1990s, Toni Antonucci began exploring friendships and social support among adults, while Arthur Aron was examining the role of relationships with romantic partners, siblings, friends, and parents in individual self-expansion. Additionally, Thomas Malloy and David Kenny developed the social relations model (an early analytic approach to understanding the roles of a person and their partner in their interactions) and Kenny later published his work on Models of Non-independence in Dyadic Research in 1996.

With a growing interest in marriage and family therapy in relationship science, in the late 1980s and 1990s, researchers such as Howard Markman, Frank Floyd, and Scott Stanley began developing romantic relationship (with a primary focus on marriages) interventions; specifically, in 1995, Floyd and colleagues published the program they developed, called Prevention Intervention and Relationship Enhancement (PREP). Interest in and development of relationship education programming increased in the 2000s due to state and federal Healthy Marriage Initiatives, which allocated grant funding to support programming that would impact disadvantaged communities.

Although there were many theoretical and empirical contributions of the 1970s and 80s, the professional evolution of relationship science was simultaneously taking place. The first international conference specifically dedicated to relationship processes took place in 1977 in Swansea, Wales, hosted by Mark Cook (a social psychologist) and Glen Wilson (a psychotherapist). In 1982, the first of the eventually bi-annual International Conference of Personal Relationships (ICPR) took place in Madison, Wisconsin, under the direction of Robin Gilmour and Steve Duck, with about 100 attendees. Two years later, in 1984, the International Society for the Study of Personal Relationships (ISSPR) was borne out of the ICPR and the Journal of Social and Personal Relationships, the first peer-reviewed journal unique to the field of relationship science, was established. Then in 1987, the Iowa Network of Personal Relationships (which would later be known as the International Network of Personal Relationships; INPR) was formed and Hal Kelley was elected president of ISSPR that same year. A few years later in 1991, Ellen Berscheid (the then-president of ISSPR) announced a merger of ISSPR and INPR, which ultimately fell through until the idea was reignited over a decade later. In 1994, the journal Personal Relationships was formally established by ISSPR and began publishing work in relationship science with Pat Noller as the editor; Anne Peplau became president of ISSPR. The changing of roles only persisted when Dan Perlman became president of ISSPR in 1996 and began discussing with the president of INPR (at the time, Barbara Sarason) how they might work to better integrate the efforts and goals of the two organizations; in 1998, Jeffry Simpson took over as editor of Personal Relationships.

The decades-long, interdisciplinary study of relationships culminated in Ellen Berscheid's 1999 article "The Greening of Relationship Science". Here, Berscheid took the opportunity to close out the 20th-century with an overview of the field's past, present, and future. She described the uniqueness and benefits of a well-integrated interdisciplinary field and the advancements that have cemented the field as an "essential science". However, she also discussed the shortcomings that were stifling the progress of the field, and provided specific advice for overcoming such limitations in the upcoming century. Some of this advice included leaving behind traditional analytic approaches that fail to consider non-independence of individuals in relationships, and prioritizing the implementation of existing methods that consider interdependent and dyadic data as well as "creatively constructing new ones". Additionally, she stressed the dire need of the field to inform public opinion and policy related specifically to intimate relationship stability (e.g., quality, dissolution/divorce)—at the time, a hotly debated topic informed by partisan politics rather than empirical evidence, and for scientists to place greater emphasis on the environments in which relationships operate. Her article foreshadowed and influenced the evolution of the field in the 21st century, and its structure has since been adapted by other relationship researchers to reflect on how far the field has come and where it is going.

=== 2000s ===
The year 2000 included new developments in the field such as Nancy Collins and Brooke Feeney's work on partner support-seeking and caregiving in romantic relationships from an attachment theory perspective, and Reis, Sheldon, Gable, and colleagues' article "Daily Well-being: The Role of Autonomy, Competence, & Relatedness". A couple of years later, Rena Repetti, Shelley Taylor, and Teresa Seaman published work that addressed some of Berscheid's 1999 article concerns as well as used health psychology perspectives to inform relationship science. They empirically demonstrated the negative effects of family home environments with significant conflict and aggression on the mental and physical health of individuals in both childhood and adulthood. Simultaneously, the early 21st century was a time for major changes in the professional development of the field. In 2004, after previously unsuccessful attempts, ISSPR and INPR merged to form the International Association for Relationship Research (IARR).

In 2007, Harry Reis published "Steps Toward the Ripening of Relationship Science", an article inspired by Ellen Berscheid's 1999 article, that recapped and made suggestions for furthering the field. He discussed important works that could be used as framework for guiding the field, including Thomas Bradbury's 2002 article, "Research on Relationships as a Prelude to Action"—an article focussed on the mechanisms for improvement of relationship research including better integration of research findings, more ethnically and culturally diverse sampling, and interdisciplinary, problem-centered approaches to research. Reis argued the need for integrating and organizing theories, for paying more attention to non-romantic relationships (the primary focus of the area) in research and intervention development, and the use of his theory of perceived partner responsiveness to enable this progress. Fast-forwarding to 2012, relationship researchers again heeded Berscheid's advice of using relationships science to inform real-world issues. Eli Finkel, Paul Eastwick, Benjamin Karney, Harry Reis, and Susan Sprecher wrote an article discussing the impact of online dating on relationship formation and both its positive and negative implications for relationship outcomes compared to traditional offline dating. Additionally, in 2018, Emily Impett and Amy Muise published their follow-up to Berscheid's article, "The Sexing of Relationship Science: Impetus for the Special Issue on Sex and Relationships". Here, they called on the field to draw more attention to and place greater weight on the role of sexual satisfaction; they identified this area of research as nascent but fertile territory to explore sexuality in relationships and establish it as an integral part of relationship science.

== Types of relationships studied ==
The field recognizes that, for two individuals to be in the most basic form of a social relationship, they must be interdependent—that is, have interconnected behaviors and mutual influence on one another.

=== Personal relationships ===
A relationship is said to be personal when there is not only interdependence (the defining feature of all relationships), but when two people recognize each other as unique and unable to be replaced. Personal relationships can include colleagues, acquaintances, family members, and others, so long as the criteria for the relationship are met.

=== Close relationships ===
The definition of close relationships that is frequently referred back to is one from Harold Kelley and colleague's 1983 book, Close Relationships. This asserts that a close relationship is "one of strong, frequent, and diverse interdependence that lasts over a considerable period of time". This definition indicates that not even all personal relationships may be considered close relationships. Close relationships can include family relationships (e.g., parent–child, siblings, grandparent–grandchild, in-laws, etc.) and friendships.

=== Intimate relationships ===
What defines a relationship as intimate are the same features that comprise a close relationship (i.e., must be personal, must have bidirectional interdependence, and must be close), but there must also be a shared sexual passion or the potential to be sexually intimate. Intimate relationships can include married couples, dating partners, and other relationships that satisfy the aforementioned criteria.

== Theories ==
=== Social exchange theory ===
Social exchange theory was developed in the late 1950s and early 1960s as an economic approach to describing social experiences. It addresses the transactional nature of relationships whereby people determine how to proceed in a relationship after assessing the costs versus the benefits. A prominent subset that secured the place of social exchange theory in relationship science is interdependence theory, which was articulated in 1959 by Harold Kelley and John Thibaut in The Social Psychology of Groups. Even though Kelley and Thibaut's intent was to discuss the theory as it applied to groups, they began by exploring the effects of mutual influence as it pertains to two people together (i.e., a dyad). They expanded upon this process at the dyadic level in later years, further developing the idea that people in relationships 1) compare the overall positive to overall negative outcomes of their relationship (i.e., outcome = rewards - costs), which they then 2) compare to what they expect to get or think they should be getting out of the relationship (i.e., comparison level or "CL") to determine how satisfied they are (i.e., satisfaction = outcome - CL), and finally 3) compare the outcome of their relationship to the possible options of being either in another relationship or not in any relationship at all (i.e., comparison level for alternatives or "CL_{alt}") to determine how dependent they are on the relationship/their partner (i.e., dependence = outcome - CL_{alt}). They described this as having practical and important implications for commitment in a relationship such that those less satisfied by and less dependent on their partner may be more inclined to end the relationship (e.g., divorce, in the context of a marriage).

Interdependence theory has also been the basis of other influential works, such as Caryl Rusbult's investment model theory. The investment model (later known as the 'investment model of commitment processes') directly adopts the principles of interdependence theory and extends it by asserting that the magnitude of an individual's investment of resources in the relationship increases the costs of leaving the relationship, which decreases the value of alternatives, and therefore increases commitment to the relationship.

=== Social learning theory ===
Social learning theory can be traced back to the 1940s and originated from the ideas of behaviorists like Clark L. Hull and B. F. Skinner. However, it was notably articulated by Albert Bandura in his 1971 book, Social Learning Theory. It is closely related to social exchange theory (and the subsequently developed interdependence theory), but focuses more on drawbacks and rewards found directly in behavior and interactions (e.g., distant vs. displays affection) opposed to broad costs and benefits. In the context of close and intimate relationships, it emphasizes that partners' behaviors (e.g., displays of empathy during a conversation) are central in that they not only invoke an immediate response, but teach one another what to believe and how to feel about their relationship (e.g., feeling secure and trusting), which affects how satisfied one is—a process that is described as cyclical.

Social learning theory as it applies to relationship science led to the development of other prominent theories such as Gerald Patterson's coercion theory, outlined in his book, Coercive Family Process. Coercion theory focuses on why people end up in and stay in unhealthy relationships by explaining that individuals unintentionally reinforce each other's bad behaviors. This pattern is also described as cyclical where partners will continue to behave in a certain, negative way (e.g., nagging) when their partner reinforces said behavior (e.g., does what partner is requesting through nagging), which tells them that their negative behavior is effective at getting the outcome they desired.

=== Attachment theory ===
Attachment theory was formalized in a trilogy of books, Attachment and Loss, published in 1969, 1973, and 1980 by John Bowlby. The theory was originally developed to pertain to parent–child relationships, and more specifically during infancy. This idea that children rely on a primary caregiver—an attachment figure—to feel safe and confident to explore the world (a secure base) and come back to being loved, accepted, and supported (a safe haven) has been applied extensively to adult relationships. This was first applied by Cindy Hazan and Phillip Shaver in 1987, specifically in the context of romantic relationships. Their research found that not only were attachment styles (i.e., secure, avoidant, anxious/ambivalent) relatively stable from infancy and into adulthood, but that these three major styles predicted the ways in which adults experienced romantic relationships. This spawned nearly three-and-a-half decades of research exploring the importance of attachment processes in childhood (i.e., parent-child relationships) and their predictive value in adult relationship formation and maintenance (i.e., romantic partnerships, friendships).

Influential people who have studied close and intimate relationships from an attachment perspective include Nancy Collins, Jeffry Simpson, and Chris Fraley. Nancy Collins and Stephen Read (1990) developed one of the most widely cited and used scales assessing adult attachment styles and, additionally, their dimensions. Their work found three dimensions and investigated the extent to which they applied to individual self-esteem, trust, etc. as well as gender differences in their relevance to relationship quality in dating couples. Jeffry Simpson has conducted extensive research on the influence of attachment styles on relationships, including documenting more negative and less positive emotions expressed in a relationship by individuals who were either anxious or avoidant. Chris Fraley's work on attachment includes a prominent study that used item response theory (IRT) to explore the psychometric properties of self-report adult attachment scales. His findings indicated very low levels of desirable psychometric properties in three out of four of the most commonly used adult attachment scales. Among improvements to existing scales, he made suggestions for the future development of adult attachment scales, including more discriminating items in the secure region and additional items to tap into the low ends of anxiety and avoidance dimensions.

=== Evolutionary theories ===
Evolutionary psychology as it pertains to relationship science is a collection of theories that aim to understand mating behaviors as a product of our ancestral past and adaptation. This set of perspectives has a common thread that links the modern-day study of relationship processes and behaviors to adaptive responses and features that were developed to maximize reproductive fitness. Sexual selection says that success in competition for mates happens for those who possess traits that are more attractive to potential mating partners. Researchers have also considered the theory of parental investment, where females (compared to males) have more to lose and ancestrally were therefore more selective in mate selection; this is one facet of many observed sex differences in mate selection where male and females seek and prefer certain traits. These theoretical perspectives have been implemented widely in the study of relationships both on their own and in an integrated approach (e.g., considering cultural context).

Prominent works that have taken the evolutionary approach to studying relationship formation and processes include a review of existing research by Steven Gangstead and Martie Haselton (2015) that revealed differences in both women's sexual desires and men's reactions to women across the ovulation cycle. David Buss has extensively studied sex differences in cross-cultural mate selection, jealousy, and other relationship processes through research that integrates evolutionary perspectives with socio-cultural contexts (e.g., "Sex differences in human mate preferences: Evolutionary hypotheses tested in 37 cultures"; "Sex differences in jealousy: Evolution, physiology, and psychology", etc.). Additionally, Jeffry Simpson and Steven Gangstead have published widely cited work on relationship processes from an evolutionary lens, including research on human mating that discusses trade-offs (faced by females selecting a mate) between a potential mate's genetic fitness for having children and their willingness to help in child-rearing.

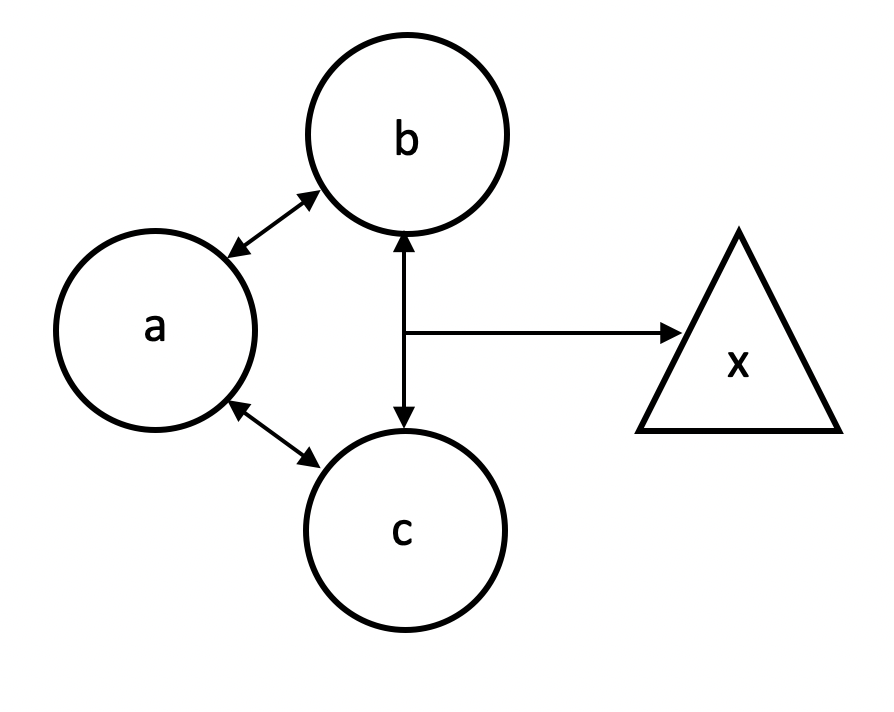
Figure 1. ABC-X Model (Adapted from McCubbin & Patterson, 1983)

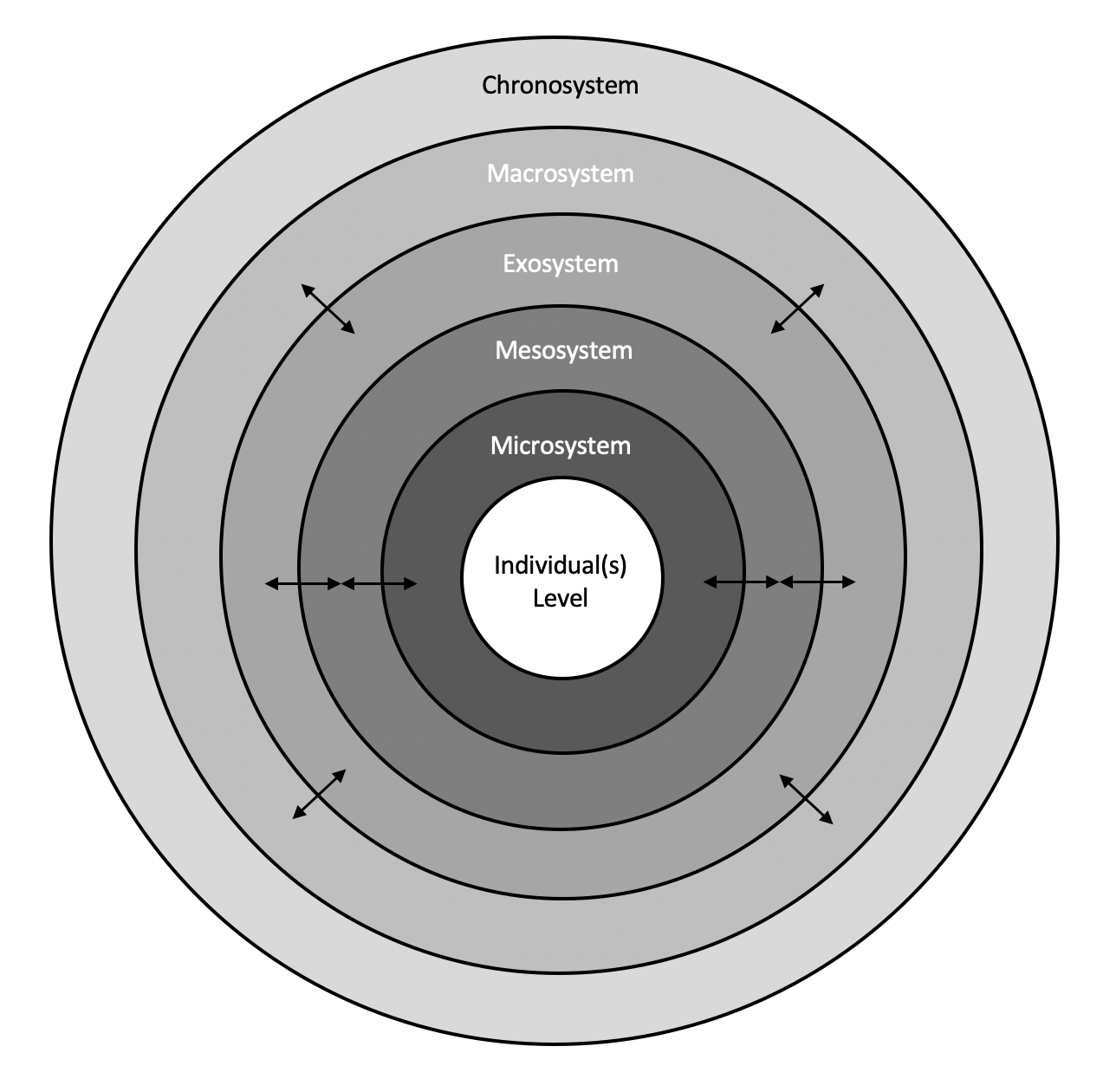
Figure 2. Bronfenbrenner's Social Ecological Model (Adapted from Bradbury & Karney, 2019)

=== Social ecological theories ===
Social ecology—derived from sociology and anthropology—approaches the study of people in a way that considers the environment or context in which people live. Social ecological models, as they pertain to relationships, explain relationship processes from a lens that consider external forces acting upon people in a relationship, whether they be family members, romantic partners, or friends.

Reuben Hill articulated one of the earliest documented social ecological models pertaining to relationship science—specifically families—in 1949. This is known as the ABC-X model or crisis theory. The 'A' in the model indicates a stressor; the 'B' indicates resources available to handle the stressor (both tangible and emotional); the 'C' indicates the interpretation of the stressor (whether it is perceived as a threat or manageable obstacle); finally, the 'X' indicates the crisis (the overall experience and response to the stressor that either strengthens or weakens families/couples). See Figure 1.

In 1977, 1979, and 1986, Urie Bronfenbrenner published a model that integrated the multiple different levels or domains of an individual's environment. It was first developed to apply to child development, but has been widely applied in relationship science. The first level is the microsystem, which contains the single, immediate context people or dyads (e.g., couple, parent-child, friends) directly find themselves in—such as a home, school, or work. The second level is the mesosystem, which considers the combined effects of two or more contexts/settings. The third level is the exosystem, which also considers the effects of two or more contexts, but specifically contains at least one context that the individual or dyad is not directly in (e.g., government, social services) but affects an environment they are directly in (e.g., home, work). The fourth level is the macrosystem, which is the broader cultural and social attitudes that affect an individual. Finally, the chronosystem is the broadest level that is specifically the dimension of time as it relates to an individual's context changes and life events. See Figure 2.

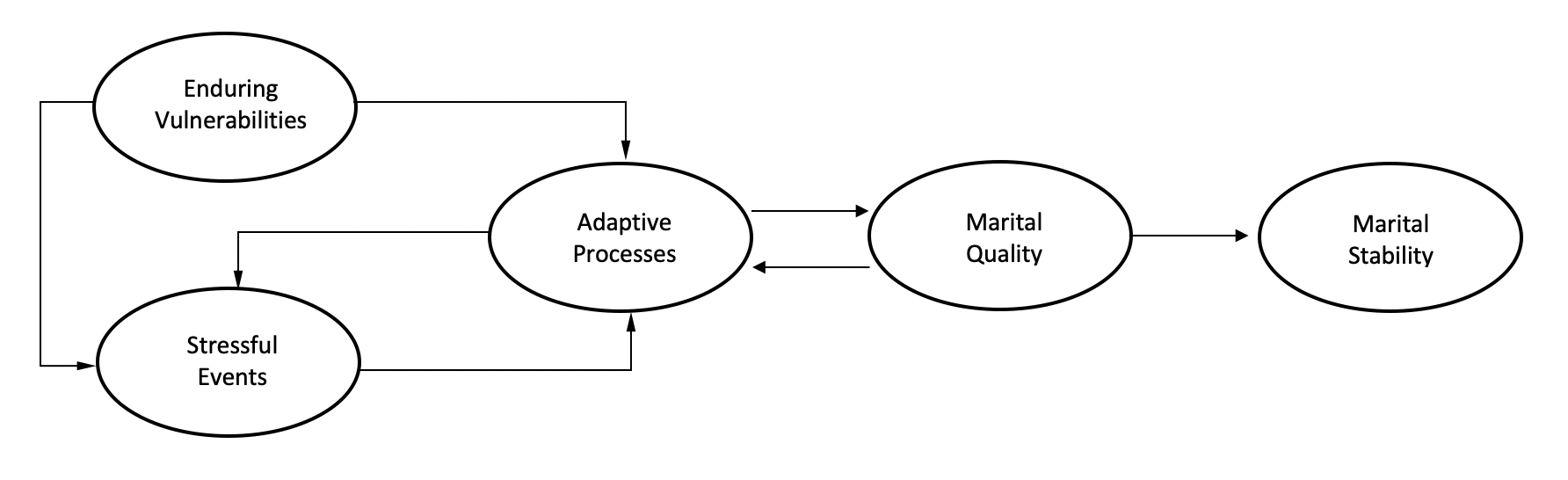
Figure 3. Vulnerability-Stress-Adaptation (VSA) Model (Adapted from Karney and Bradbury, 1995)

Researchers in relationship science have used social ecological models to study changes and stressors in relationships over time, and how couples, families, or even friends manage them given the contexts they evolve in. Application of social ecological models in relationship research have been seen in influential works such as Benjamin Karney and Thomas Bradbury's Vulnerability-Stress-Adaptation (VSA) model. The VSA model is a theoretical approach that enables researchers to study the impact of stressful events on relationship quality and stability over time (e.g., determine risk of divorce/relationship dissolution), given a couple's capacity to manage and adapt to such events. See Figure 3.

==== Relational mobility ====
In the early 2000s, a Japan-based research team defined relational mobility as a measure of how much choice individuals have in terms of whom to form relationships with, including friendships, romantic partnerships, and work relations. Relational mobility is low in cultures with a subsistence economy that requires tight cooperation and coordination, such as farming, while it is high in cultures based on nomadic herding and in urban industrial cultures. A cross-cultural study found that the relational mobility is lowest in East Asian countries where rice farming is common, and highest in South American countries. Differences in relational mobility can explain cultural differences in certain norms and behaviors, including conformity, shame, and business strategies, as well as differences in social cognition, including attribution and locus of control.

== Methodologies ==
Relationship science has relied on a variety of methods for both data collection and analysis. This includes but is not limited to: cross-sectional data, longitudinal data, self-report study, observational study, experimental study, repeated measures design, and mixed-methods procedures.

=== Self-report data ===
Relationship science relies predominantly on individuals' self-reported evaluations and descriptions of their own relationship processes. This method of data collection often comes in the form of answering a questionnaire that requires either selection from a set of fixed responses or providing open-ended responses. It is often the simplest way to study relationships, but researchers have cautioned against solely relying on this form of measurement. Some issues that arise with the use of self-report data is the difficulty of accurately answering retrospective questions or questions that require introspection. Recently, particularly in light of the anti-false positive movement in psychology, relationship scientists are encouraging the use of multiple methods (e.g., self-report data, observational data) to study the same or similar constructs in different ways. However, an identified benefit of using specifically self-report questionnaires is that many of the measures used to study relationships are standardized and are therefore used in multiple different studies, where findings across studies can provide insight into replicability.

=== Experimental data ===
Some of the earliest studies conducted in relationship science were done using laboratory experiments. The field has since used experimental methods in order to infer causality about a relationship phenomenon of interest. This requires identification of a dependent variable that will be the measured effect (e.g., performance on a stressful task) and an independent variable that will be what is manipulated (e.g., social support vs. no social support). However, a common concern with experimental study of relationship phenomena is the potential lack of generalizability of laboratory setting findings to real-world contexts.

=== Observational data ===
Observational (or, behavioral) data in relationship science is a method of making inferences about relationship processes that relies on an observer's reports, rather than a participant's own reports of their relationship. This is often done through videotaping or audio recording participants' interactions with one another and having outside observers systematically identify (i.e., code) aspects of interest dependent upon the type of relationship being studied (e.g., patience exhibited during a parent-child activity; affection exhibited during a romantic couple's discussion). This method enables researchers to study aspects of a relationship that may be sub-conscious to participants or would otherwise not be detectable through self-report measures. However, a hurdle of observational research is establishing strong inter-rater reliability—that is, the level of agreement between observers who are coding the observations. Additionally, as participants often know they are being watched or recorded and such interactions often take place in laboratory settings, observational data collection presents the issue of reactivity—when individuals change their natural response or behavior because they are being watched.

=== Longitudinal data ===
A cornerstone of the research done in relationship science is the use of multi-wave assessments and subsequent repeated measures design, multi-level modeling (MLM), and structural equation modeling (SEM). As relationships themselves are longitudinal, this approach enables researchers to assess change across time within and/or between relationships. However, most of the longitudinal research in relationship science focuses on marriages and some on parent-child relationships, while relatively few longitudinal studies on friendships or other types of relationships exist. Within longitudinal research, there is additional variation in the length of time of the study; while some studies follow individuals, couples, parents and children, etc. over the course of a few years, some study change processes across the lifespan and in multiple different relationships (e.g., from infancy into adulthood). Additionally, the frequency of and intervals of time between multi-wave assessments has considerable variation in longitudinal research; one might employ intensive longitudinal methods that require daily assessments, methods that require monthly assessments, or methods that require annual or bi-annual assessments.

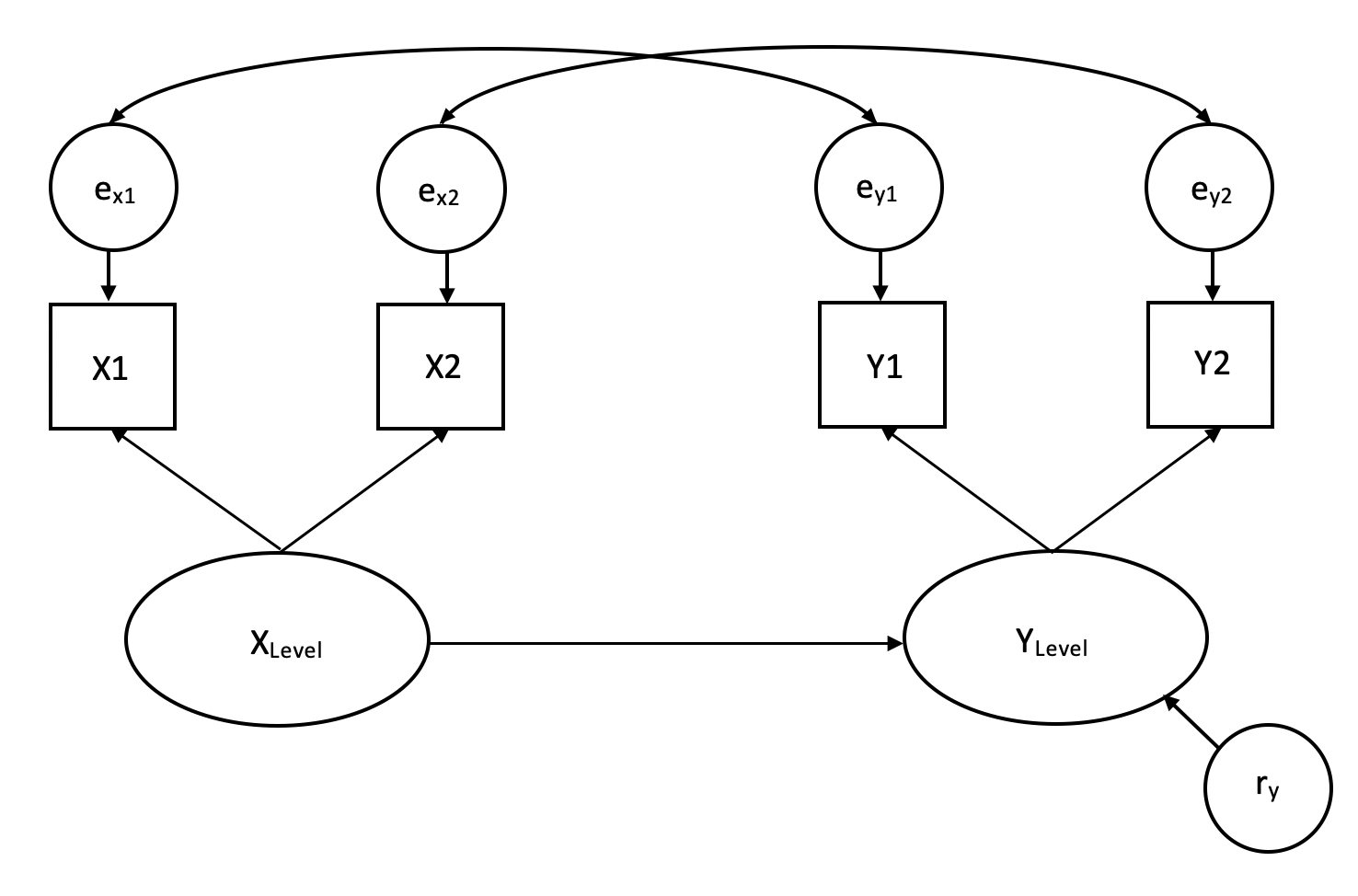
Figure 4. Common Fate Model (Adapted from Kenny, 1996 and Iida, Seidman, & Shrout, 2018)

=== Interdependent and dyadic data ===
An important turning point in the analytic approach to studying relationships came at the advent of statistically modeling interdependence and dyadic processes—that is, studying two individuals (or even two groups of individuals) simultaneously to account for the overlap in or interdependence of relationship processes. In 2006, David Kenny, Deborah Kashy, and William Cook published the book Dyadic Data Analysis, which has been widely cited as a tool of understanding and measuring non-independence. This book includes information and instructions on using MLM, SEM, and other statistical methods to study both between and within dyad phenomena. Several models have been articulated for these purposes in both journal articles and the 2006 Kenny, Kashy, & Cook text, including 1) the common fate model, 2) the mutual influence (or dyadic feedback) model, 3) the dyadic score model, and the most commonly used 4) actor-partner interdependence model (APIM).

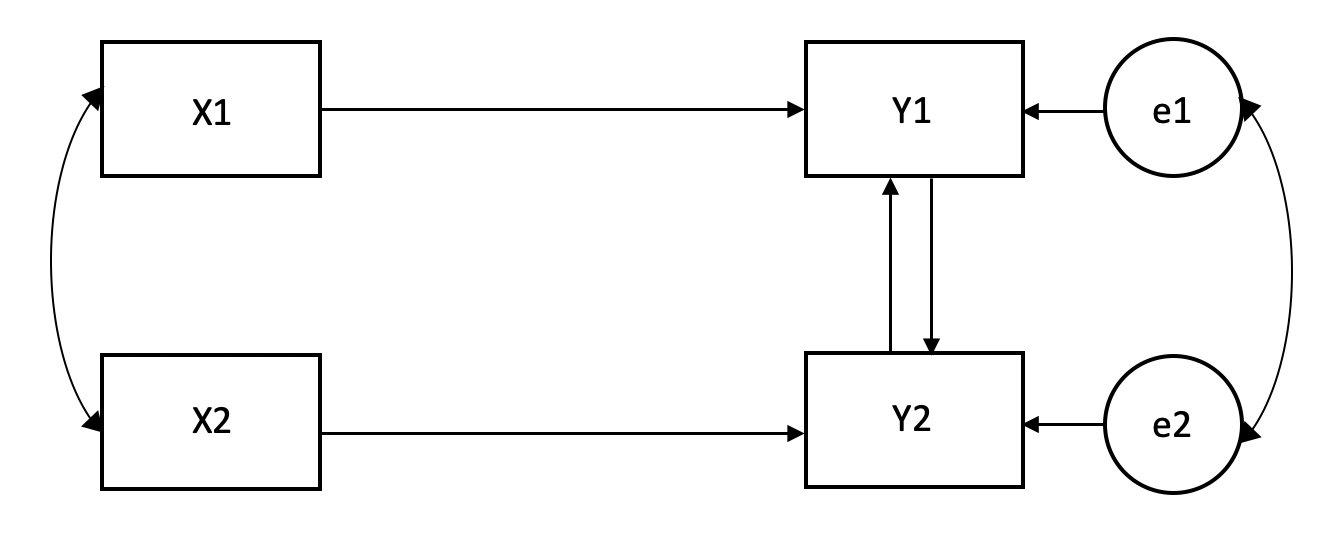
Figure 5. Mutual Influence Model (Adapted from Kenny, 1996)

==== Common fate model ====
The common fate model is a method of estimating not how two people influence one another, but how two people are similarly influenced by an external force. Dyadic means are computed for both the independent and dependent variable to estimate the effects of the dyad as a single unit. The between-dyad correlations are adjusted by the within-dyad correlations in order to remove individual-level variation. The two partners' predictor and outcome variables are observed variables that are used to compute latent variables (i.e., the 'common fate variables'). See Figure 4.

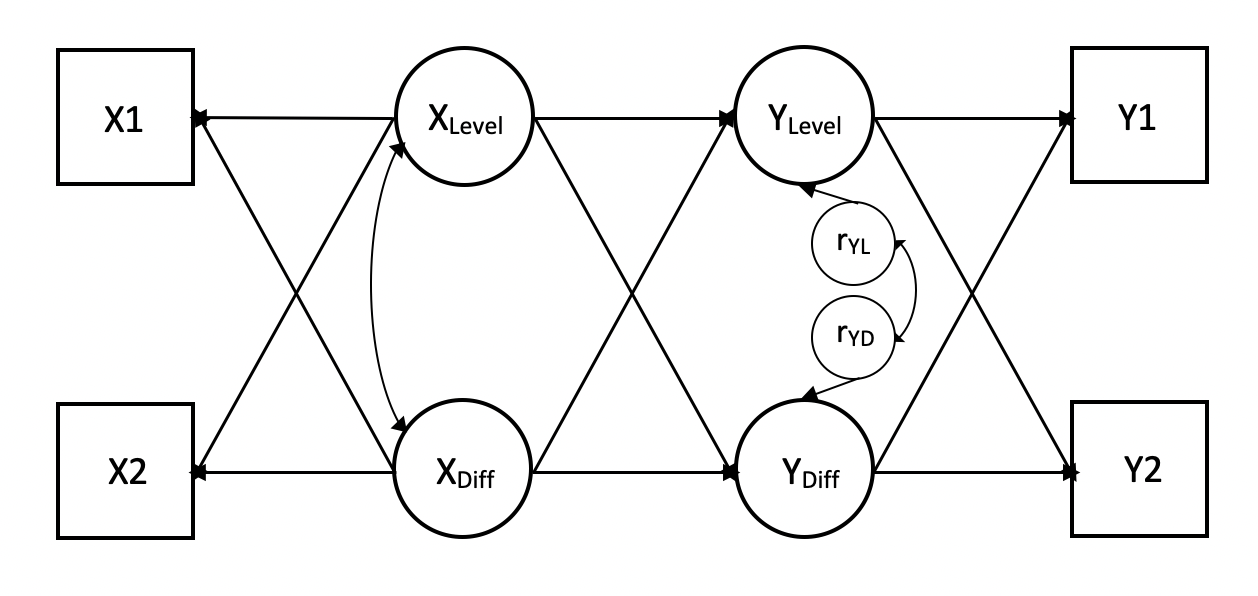
Figure 6. Dyadic Score Model (Adapted from Iida, Seidman, & Shrout, 2018)

==== Mutual influence (dyadic feedback) model ====
The mutual influence or dyadic feedback model is a method of considering reciprocal influence of partners' predictor(s) on one another's and partners' outcome on one another's. Compared to the APIM, this model assumes there are no partner effects and no other types of non-independence, as seen in the predictor-predictor and outcome-outcome paths. Additionally, it assumes equal effects of partner's influence on one another (i.e., 1 influences 2 equally as 2 influences 1). See Figure 5.

==== Dyadic score model ====
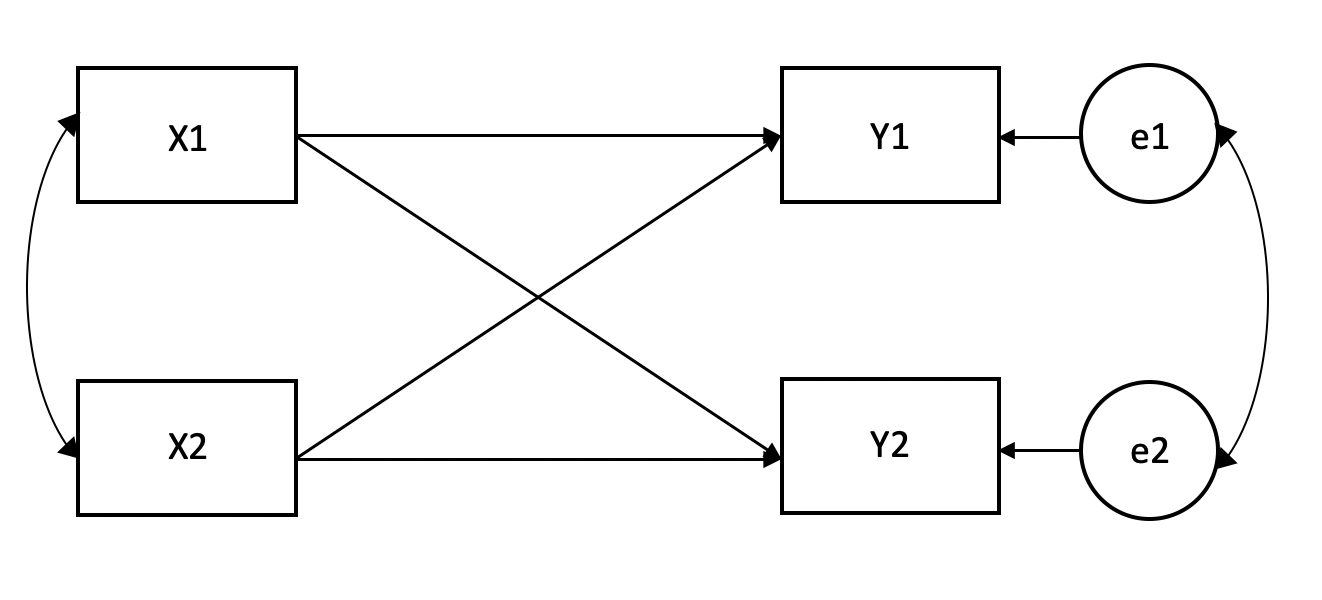
Figure 7. Actor-partner Interdependence Model (Adapted from Kenny, 1996 and Iida, Seidman, & Shrout, 2018)

The dyadic score model uses two partners observed predictor and outcome variables to compute both dyadic 'level' and 'difference' latent variables. The level variables are similar to the common fate latent variables while the difference variables represent the within-dyad contrast. See Figure 6.

==== Actor-partner interdependence model (APIM) ====
The APIM is a method of accounting for dyadic interdependence via both actor and partner effects. Specifically, it considers the influence of one partner's predictor(s) on the other partner's predictor(s) and outcome. This is modeled using regression, MLM, or SEM procedures. See Figure 7.

== See also ==
- Aristotle
- Plato
- Stanley Schachter
- Harold Kelley
- John Bowlby
- Urie Bronfenbrenner
- Ellen Berscheid
- Elaine Hatfield
- Caryl Rusbult
- David A. Kenny
- Mary Ainsworth
- Harry Harlow
- Robert Hinde
- Psychology
- Anthropology
- Economics
- Sociology
- Biology
- Social psychology
- Clinical psychology
- Developmental psychology
- Cognitive psychology
- Cognitive behavioral therapy
- Family therapy
- Systems ecology
- Social ecological model
- Social exchange theory
- Social learning theory
- Attachment theory
- Human mating strategies
- Strategic pluralism
- Social connection
- Human bonding
- Physical intimacy
- Emotional intimacy
- Social relationships
- Interpersonal relationships
- Interpersonal ties
- Friendship
- Family
- Parenting
- Sibling relationship
- Love
- Platonic love
- Intimate relationship
- Romance
- Marriage
- Dating
