= Terri L. Orbuch =

American sociologist

Terri L. Orbuch is an American sociologist, social psychologist, author, and academic. She is a Distinguished professor of Sociology in the Department of Sociology, Anthropology, Social Work, and Criminal justice at Oakland University. She is a Research professor at the Survey Research Center within the Institute for Social Research at the University of Michigan.

She is commonly referred to in popular media as 'The Love Doctor'. Orbuch is recognized for her work on close interpersonal relationships, marital quality, and relationship dissolution. Her work connects academic research in social psychology and public science education using trade books, media commentary, and educational programming. In addition to her academic work, she works as a relationship coach and instructs a certification program through the Global Love Institute.

== Early life and education ==
Orbuch completed her higher education in sociology, specializing in social psychology. Before her doctoral studies, she earned a Bachelor of Arts (B.A.) in 1981 and a Master of Arts (M.A.) in 1983, both in sociology and psychology from the University of Wisconsin–Madison. In 1988, she received her Doctor of Philosophy (PhD) degree in sociology from the University of Wisconsin–Madison. Her doctoral research highlighted social cognition, cognitive attributions, mental accounting, and the process of loss and change within personal relationships. During her graduate studies, she trained and became qualified as a Licensed Marriage and Family Therapist (LMFT).

== Academic career and research ==
Upon completing her doctorate in 1988, Orbuch completed a two-year postdoctoral fellowship in the Department of Psychology at the University of Iowa under Dr. John Harvey. She subsequently joined the faculty of the Department of Sociology at the University of Michigan, where she established a long-term research affiliation with the Survey Research Center at the Institute for Social Research. In 1998, Orbuch joined the faculty of Oakland University, where she was eventually designated Distinguished professor in 2018. Her academic instruction surrounds interpersonal relationships, human sexuality, community engagement, and the social contexts of gender and race for relationship stability.

A major part of her research involves serving as director and principal investigator of the Early Years of Marriage (EYM) Project, initiated in 1986 with funding from the National Institutes of Health (NIH) and the National Institute of Child Health and Human Development (NICHD). The study was conducted on a cohort of 373 newlywed couples, comprising 199 Black couples and 174 White couples, entering their first marriages in Wayne County, Michigan. The project, established with social psychologists Joseph Veroff and Elizabeth Douvan, was one of the few long-term longitudinal studies in the United States to analyze marital stability, health outcomes, and divorce patterns in both Black couples and White couples.

For more than three decades, the EYM study monitored the cohort through systematic interviews, generating results on the experience of early marriage, the development of marriage over time for both Black American and White American couples, conflict management styles, the challenges of parenthood and family responsibilities, and how structural and interactional factors affect relationship longevity. The primary datasets from the project are archived at the Inter-university Consortium for Political and Social Research (ICPSR).

== Media and public engagement ==
Orbuch appears frequently on popular media under the moniker "The Love Doctor". She hosted the national Public Television special Secrets From The Love Doctor and has appeared as a relationship expert on broadcast network programs including The Today Show, Good Morning America, and CNN. Her research and commentary are frequently featured in national print outlets such as The Wall Street Journal, The New York Times, USA Today, and Time magazine. Orbuch also acts as an advisor, content creator, and consultant for digital relationship platforms, mobile applications, and public workshops focused on dating and marriage.

== Awards and honors ==
Orbuch has received several academic and professional honors throughout her career. She was named an IARR Fellow by the International Association for Relationship Research in 2016, following her receipt of the Berscheid-Hatfield Award for Distinguished Mid-Career Achievement in 2012. Her research contributions have earned recognitions from the IARR, including the Article Award in 2004 and the Best Paper Award in 2022. Additionally, she received the Oakland University New Investigator Research Excellence Award in 1999 and the All-University Research Excellence Award in 2014.

== Personal life ==
Orbuch is married to Stuart Jankelovitz, a sales executive and small business consultant. The couple resides in West Bloomfield, Michigan and has two children.

== Selected Publications ==
=== Books ===
- Orbuch, T. L. (2022). Secrets to Surviving Your Children's Love Relationships: A Guide for Parents. Wise Action Publishing. ISBN 978-0692131930.
- Orbuch, T.L. (2016). 5 Simple Steps to Take Your Marriage from Good to Great. Greenleaf Publishing. ISBN 0385342861
- Orbuch, T. L. (2012). Finding Love Again: 5 Simple Steps to a New and Happy Relationship. Sourcebooks. ISBN 978-1402264382.
- Holmberg, D., Orbuch, T. L., & Veroff, J. (2004). Thrice Told Tales: Married Couples Tell Their Stories. Lawrence Erlbaum Associates. ISBN 978-0805841008.
- Orbuch, T. L. (Ed.). (1992). Close Relationship Loss: Theoretical Approaches. Springer-Verlag. ISBN 978-0387977461.
- Orbuch, T. L. (Ed.). (1991). Attributions, Accounts, and Close Relationships. Springer-Verlag. ISBN 978-0387975689.
- Cohen, B. & Orbuch, T. L. (1990). Introduction to Sociology: A College Review Textbook, McGraw-Hill.

=== Journal Articles and Book Chapters ===
- Orbuch, T., Kanter, J., and Rauer, A. (2026). The longitudinal course of couple relationships. In The Cambridge Handbook of Personal Relationships (3rd ed.), Vangelisti, Perlman & Sprecher (Eds.). ISBN 9781009381901. DOI:10.1017/9781009381949.008
- Shrout, M. R., Leonard, M. J., Adisa, R., Orbuch, T. L., Rice Wallace, T. M., Franks, M. M., & Aron, A. (2026). Effects of spousal, friend, and family relationships on marital instability across the first 16 years of marriage. Journal of Social and Personal Relationships, doi:10.1177/02654075261436
- Lyons, H.A., Warner, D.F. and Orbuch, T. L. (2025). Sexual expression and subsequent marital quality among partnered older adults. Archives of Sexual Behavior, 54:189–203. DOI: 10.1007/s10508-024-02956-9
- Galovan, A. M., Orbuch, T., Shrout, M. R., Drebit, E., & Rice, T. M. (2023). Taking stock of the longitudinal study of romantic couple relationships: The last 20 years. Personal Relationships, 30, 174–216.
- Shrout, M. R., Brown, R. D., Orbuch, T., & Weigel, D. J. (2019), A multidimensional examination of marital conflict and subjective health over 16 years. Personal Relationships, 26(3), 490–506.
- Orbuch, T. L., Veroff, J., Hassan, H., & Horrocks, J. (2002). Who will divorce: A 14-year longitudinal study of Black couples and White couples. Journal of Social and Personal Relationships, 19(2), 179–202.
