= Omri Gillath =

Israeli-American social psychologist

- עמרי גילת
- Born: 1970 (age 55–56)
- Citizenship: Israel, United States
- Education: University of Haifa (BA); Bar-Ilan University (MA, PhD)
- Known for: Research on adult attachment, close relationships, social neuroscience, and relational Artificial Intelligence.
- Scientific career
- Fields: Social psychology, social neuroscience
- Workplaces: University of Kansas
- Doctoral advisor: Mario Mikulincer

Omri Gillath (Hebrew: עמרי גילת; born 1970) is an Israeli-American social psychologist. He is a professor of psychology at the University of Kansas, where he directs the Gillath Lab. His research applies attachment theory to adult relationships, using methods drawn from social psychology and social neuroscience, and addresses close relationships, caregiving, sexuality, prosocial behavior, friendship, social networks, and Artificial Intelligence.

Gillath has co-authored two books, Relationship Science (2012) and Adult Attachment: A Concise Introduction to Theory and Research (2016), and has served as an associate editor of several journals in the field of personality and social psychology.

== Early life and education ==
Gillath was born in 1970. He received a Bachelor of Arts in psychology from the University of Haifa in 1997, where as an undergraduate he worked in the stress laboratory of psychologist Shlomo Breznitz. He then studied at Bar-Ilan University, earning a Master of Arts in experimental psychology in 2000 and a PhD in 2003 under the supervision of Mario Mikulincer, a prominent attachment researcher.

From 2003 to 2006, Gillath was a postdoctoral fellow at the University of California, Davis, where he worked with attachment researcher Phillip Shaver and the cognitive neuroscientist Silvia Bunge. During this period he used functional magnetic resonance imaging to study the brain processes associated with adult attachment.

== Career ==
Gillath joined the University of Kansas in 2006 as an assistant professor of psychology. He was promoted to associate professor in 2011 and to full professor in 2016. In 2013 he was a visiting associate professor at the University of California, Santa Barbara. Between 2022 and 2024 he served as associate chair and director of graduate studies in the Department of Psychology at Kansas, and the social program director. Since 2023 he has served as the associate director of the Center for Cyber-Social Dynamics

He has held a number of editorial roles, serving as associate editor of Personal Relationships (2012–2018), Personality and Social Psychology Bulletin (2018–2021), and the interpersonal relations and group processes section of the Journal of Personality and Social Psychology (from 2023).

== Research ==
Gillath's work extends attachment theory—originally developed by John Bowlby and Mary Ainsworth to describe infant–caregiver bonds—to adult relationships, integrating measures of individual differences in attachment style with experimental, neuroscientific, and genetic methods. According to the academic database Research.com, his publications had received more than 12,000 citations by 2026, with a D-index of 45.

=== Attachment, the brain, and genetics ===
Working with Shaver, Bunge, and Mikulincer, Gillath used neuroimaging to examine how people differing in attachment style regulate emotion, reporting that attachment-related anxiety and avoidance were associated with distinct patterns of brain activity when participants tried to suppress negative thoughts. In a 2008 study with Shaver and colleagues, he reported associations between attachment insecurity and polymorphisms of the dopamine (DRD2) and serotonin (5-HT2A) receptor genes, one of the first studies to investigate molecular-genetic correlates of adult attachment.

=== Attachment security priming ===
Gillath has studied "security priming," the experimental technique of briefly exposing people to cues of safety and support to temporarily heighten felt security. In 2022 he and colleagues published a meta-analysis in Personality and Social Psychology Review synthesizing 120 studies (about 19,000 participants), reporting that security priming produced a moderate positive effect across affective, cognitive, and behavioral outcomes, while also addressing concerns about the replicability of priming research.

=== Friendship and social networks ===
Gillath has applied attachment theory to friendship and social networks. A 2017 study he led, combining attachment theory with social network analysis, reported that the patterns governing romantic and parent–child relationships also shape people's broader networks of friends; the work received coverage in outlets including ScienceDaily. Related research has examined "relational mobility" and people's willingness to dissolve social ties.

=== Attachment, technology, and artificial intelligence ===
More recently, Gillath has extended attachment research to human interactions with technology. In a 2021 study he and colleagues reported that boosting attachment security could increase people's willingness to trust artificial intelligence, suggesting that the psychology of human relationships also informs how people relate to machines.

== Public engagement ==
Gillath communicates attachment research to general audiences. He has written for the public-facing magazine Psychology Today and delivered a TEDx talk, "The Power of (Secure) Love," at TEDxOverlandPark.

== Books ==
- Gillath, Omri; Adams, Glenn; Kunkel, Adrianne (2012). Relationship Science: Integrating Evolutionary, Neuroscience, and Sociocultural Approaches. Washington, D.C.: American Psychological Association. ISBN 978-1-4338-1123-4.
- Gillath, Omri; Karantzas, Gery C.; Fraley, R. Chris (2016). Adult Attachment: A Concise Introduction to Theory and Research. Academic Press. ISBN 978-0-12-420020-3.

== Awards and honors ==
- J. Michael Young Academic Advisor Award, University of Kansas (2009)
- Caryl Rusbult Close Relationships Early Career Award, Society for Personality and Social Psychology (2011)
- SAGE Young Scholars Award, Foundation for Personality and Social Psychology (2011)
- Gerald R. Miller Award for Early Career Achievement, International Association for Relationship Research (2012)
- John C. Wright Graduate Mentor Award, University of Kansas (2016)

== Fellowships ==
Gillath has been elected a fellow of two major professional societies in his field:

- Fellow, Society of Experimental Social Psychology (2009)
- Fellow, Society for Personality and Social Psychology (2015)

Earlier in his career he held a Positive Psychology Summer Institute Fellowship (2003) and a postdoctoral fellowship at the University of California, Davis (2003–2006).

== Personal life ==
Gillath is married to Irit Gillath and has two children.

== Selected publications ==
- Gillath, O., Karantzas, G. C., Romano, D., & Karantzas, K. M. (2022). "Attachment security priming: A meta-analysis." Personality and Social Psychology Review, 26(2), 183–241.
- Gillath, O., Ai, T., Branicky, M. S., Keshmiri, S., Davison, R. B., & Spaulding, R. (2021). "Attachment and trust in artificial intelligence." Computers in Human Behavior, 115, 106607.
- Gillath, O., Karantzas, G. C., & Selcuk, E. (2017). "A net of friends: Investigating friendship by integrating attachment theory and social network analysis." Personality and Social Psychology Bulletin, 43(11), 1546–1565.
- Gillath, O., Shaver, P. R., Baek, J. M., & Chun, D. S. (2008). "Genetic correlates of adult attachment style." Personality and Social Psychology Bulletin, 34(10), 1396–1405.
- Gillath, O., Bunge, S. A., Shaver, P. R., Wendelken, C., & Mikulincer, M. (2005). "Attachment-style differences in the ability to suppress negative thoughts: Exploring the neural correlates." NeuroImage, 28(4), 835–847.
