= Guy Bodenmann =

Swiss Psychologist, Psychotherapist and Professor at the University of Zürich

- Bodenmann in 2026
- Born: Jose-Guy Bodenmann; 1962 (age 63–64)
- Education: University of Fribourg
- Known for: Dyadic coping Systemic Transactional Model; Dyadic Coping Inventory; Couple Coping Enhancement Training
- Awards: Vigener Award (1995)
- Scientific career
- Fields: Clinical psychology, relationship science, couples therapy
- Workplaces: University of Zurich; University of Fribourg
- Doctoral advisor: Meinrad Perrez

Jose-Guy Bodenmann (born 1962), commonly known as Guy Bodenmann, is a Swiss psychologist, psychotherapist, and professor of clinical psychology at the University of Zurich. His research focuses on children and adolescents, couples and families, particularly stress and coping in intimate relationships. He developed the Systemic Transactional Model of dyadic coping, the Dyadic Coping Inventory (DCI), and the Couple Coping Enhancement Training (CCET).

== Early life and education ==
Bodenmann initially grew up in Bern and later in the French-speaking part of Switzerland. He originally intended to become a painter and began studying art history and German studies in Bern before discontinuing those studies and changing to clinical special education and psychology.

Bodenmann studied clinical psychology, general and applied psychology, and clinical special education at the University of Fribourg. He received a diploma in clinical special education in 1987 and a lic. phil. degree (equivalent to a master's degree) in clinical psychology in 1991. In 1995, he completed his doctorate in clinical psychology with a dissertation on stress and coping in couples, Bewältigung von Stress in Partnerschaften: der Einfluss von Belastungen auf die Qualität und Stabilität von Paarbeziehungen.

From 1993 to 1994, he was a visiting researcher with John Gottman at the University of Washington in Seattle. In 1999, Bodenmann completed his habilitation and received the venia legendi in clinical psychology.

Bodenmann is a federally recognized psychotherapist in Switzerland and a specialist in psychotherapy of the Federation of Swiss Psychologists (FSP). He is trained in cognitive behavioral therapy with the Swiss Society for Behavioural Therapy (SGVT) and received further training in couples therapy with Neil Jacobson, John Gottman, Kurt Hahlweg, and Brigitte Schröder.

== Academic career ==
From 1988 to 1991, Bodenmann was a junior academic assistant and, from 1991 to 1995, an assistant to psychologist Meinrad Perrez at the University of Fribourg.

From 1995 to 2008, he headed the university's Institute for Family Research and Counseling, initially as coordinator and subsequently as director. From 2001 to 2005, he held a professorship funded by the Swiss National Science Foundation, and from 2005 to 2008 he was associate professor of clinical relationship psychology at the University of Fribourg.

In 2003, Bodenmann declined an appointment to the chair of adult clinical psychology at the University of Geneva.

In 2008, he became full professor of clinical psychology at the University of Zurich, with a focus on children and adolescents and on couples and families. He is director of the university's outpatient clinic for couples therapy and its outpatient clinic for child and adolescent psychotherapy. He has also served as co-president of the Academy for Behavioural Therapy in Childhood and Adolescence (AVKJ) and as director of postgraduate programs in cognitive behavioral therapy for children and adolescents and in school psychology.

== Research ==
Bodenmann's research includes stress and coping in couples, prevention and relationship education, couples psychotherapy, mental disorders in close relationships, the effects of parental relationship distress on children, and familial protective and risk factors in child development.

A scoping review by Jennifer A. Sharkey, Jacqueline S. Feather, and Sonja Goedeke examined 15,418 publications from 1,687 academic journals to identify major themes, theories, journals, and researchers in relationship science. In its analysis of researchers, Bodenmann ranked fourth among the most prolific relationship researchers identified by the review, behind Phillip Shaver, John Gottman, and Jeffry Simpson. The University of Zurich describes the finding as ranking Bodenmann fourth among the world's most influential relationship researchers.

=== Dyadic coping ===
A major focus of Bodenmann's research is dyadic coping, referring to the ways in which partners respond jointly to stress. In 1991 Bodenmann and Perrez coined the term “dyadic coping” to describe the way couples cope with stress together. This term has since become a guiding concept in research.

Bodenmann subsequently developed the Systemic Transactional Model (STM), which conceptualizes stress and coping within couples as interdependent processes. The model distinguishes supportive, delegated, common, and negative forms of dyadic coping.

Bodenmann also developed the Dyadic Coping Inventory (DCI), a questionnaire designed to assess partners' management of stress within a relationship. According to the University of Zurich, the DCI has been translated into 24 languages and validated in 15. English version was validated by Ledermann et al. 2010 and Randall et a. 2015.

A 2019 review by Mariana K. Falconier and Rebekka Kuhn described Bodenmann's Systemic Transactional Model as the theoretical model that had guided most research on dyadic coping. A 2015 meta-analysis found a substantial association between dyadic coping and relationship satisfaction.

=== Couple Coping Enhancement Training ===
Based on his work on dyadic coping, Bodenmann developed Paarlife, known internationally as the Couple Coping Enhancement Training (CCET). The program aims to strengthen relationships by improving stress-related emotional self-disclosure, empathic listening, and dyadic coping.

A version adapted to sexual minority couples, the Couples Coping Enhancement Training – Sexual Minority Stress (CCET-SMS), has also been developed and evaluated.

Bodenmann has described his research stay with Gottman as influential in the development of his scientific work. Whereas his earlier research concentrated primarily on stress, he subsequently integrated stress research with the study of couple relationships.

== Awards and honors ==
- In 1995, Bodenmann received the Vigener Award of the University of Fribourg.
- In 2018, Bodenmann, Silvia Donato, Miriam Parise, Raffaella Iafrate, Anna Bertoni, and Catrin Finkenauer received the IARR Article Award from the International Association for Relationship Research for their article Dyadic coping responses and partners' perceptions for couple satisfaction: An actor–partner interdependence analysis.
- Couples Coping with Stress: A Cross-Cultural Perspective, edited by Mariana K. Falconier, Ashley K. Randall, and Bodenmann, was selected as a CHOICE Outstanding Academic Title in 2018.
- Bodenmann and Thomas N. Bradbury's review Interventions for Couples was recognized in the Psyche Awards for Valuable Contributions to Psychotherapy.

== Selected publications ==
=== Books ===
- Bodenmann, Guy (2000). Stress und Coping bei Paaren. Hogrefe. ISBN 978-3-8017-1352-2.
- Bodenmann, Guy (2012). Verhaltenstherapie mit Paaren: Ein bewältigungsorientierter Ansatz. Huber. ISBN 978-3-456-85106-8.
- Bodenmann, Guy (2016). Lehrbuch Klinische Paar- und Familienpsychologie. Hogrefe. ISBN 978-3-456-85620-9.
- Falconier, Mariana K.; Randall, Ashley K.; Bodenmann, Guy, eds. (2016). Couples Coping with Stress: A Cross-Cultural Perspective. Routledge. ISBN 978-1-138-90665-5.
- Bodenmann, Guy; Perrez, Meinrad; Schär, Marcel (2023). Klassische Lerntheorien: Grundlagen und Anwendungen in Erziehung und Psychotherapie. Hogrefe. ISBN 978-3-456-86184-5.

=== Articles ===
- Bodenmann, G.; Perrez, Meinrad (1991). "Dyadisches Coping – eine systemische Betrachtungsweise der Belastungsbewältigung in Partnerschaften". Zeitschrift für Familienforschung. 3 (3): 4–25.
- Bodenmann, G. (1995). "A systemic-transactional conceptualization of stress and coping in couples". Swiss Journal of Psychology. 54 (1): 34–49.
- Bodenmann, G. (1997). Dyadic coping - a systemic-transactional view of stress and coping among couples: Theory and empirical findings. European Review of Applied Psychology, 47, 137-140.
- Bodenmann, Guy; Shantinath, S. D. (2004). "The Couples Coping Enhancement Training (CCET): A new approach to prevention of marital distress based upon stress and coping". Family Relations. 53 (5): 477–484.
- Falconier, Mariana K.; Jackson, Jeffrey B.; Hilpert, Peter; Bodenmann, Guy (2015). "Dyadic coping and relationship satisfaction: A meta-analysis". Clinical Psychology Review. 42: 28–46. doi:10.1016/j.cpr.2015.07.002.

== Personal life ==
Bodenmann is married to psychologist and couples therapist Corinne Bodenmann-Kehl, with whom he has also published. She accompanied him during his research stay at the University of Washington. They have three children.

== Podcast ==
Since 2023, Bodenmann and Kristina Schneider have produced the interview-format psychology podcast Beziehungen verstehen ("Understanding Relationships").
