= Mirman School =

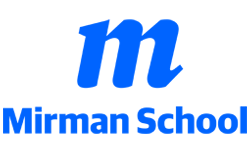

Location
- Los Angeles, California; United States; 34.12937°N 118.48433°W

Information
- Type: Independent
- Established: 1962; 64 years ago
- Head of school: Dr. Marina Kheel
- Enrollment: Lower school: 210 upper school: 110 (2011)
- Campus type: Urban
- Colors: Blue, White, Gray, and Maroon
- Athletics: Basketball, volleyball, soccer, flag football, track and field, cross country
- Mascot: The Mustang
- Website: www.mirman.org

Mirman School is an independent, co-educational school for highly gifted children located at 16180 Mulholland Drive in Bel-Air, Los Angeles, California, United States, with approximately 400 pupils aged 5 to 14. Mirman School is accredited by the California Association of Independent Schools (CAIS) and the Western Association of Schools and Colleges WASC for grades K-8. Mirman is one of a handful of schools for the highly gifted (IQ of 138 or above) in the United States.

== History ==
Mirman School was founded in 1962 by Norman and Beverly Mirman, who started the school in their home. A year later, the school expanded to a facility on Pico Boulevard, and classes were held there until the current Mulholland campus was opened in 1971. Soon after, the school expanded to contain a middle school located on the same campus.

== School structure ==
Mirman is one of a handful of schools for the highly gifted (IQ of 138 or above) in the United States. Instead of traditional grade levels, Mirman School consists of a lower school and an upper school; the lower containing kindergarten through fourth grade, and the upper consisting of fifth grade through eighth grade. Each lower-school classroom contains approximately 15 students in kindergarten to 18 students in fourth grade. Many students leave after the second year of upper school and matriculate to a conventional seventh grade class. However, the administration of the school encourages students to stay through fourth year upper school when they can matriculate to ninth grade (or, rarely, tenth grade), or in some instances seek early admission to various colleges.

=== Lower school ===
In the lower school, there are three classes for each academic level (or grade). Each class has a primary teacher and assistant teacher who instruct the students in reading, mathematics, English, history, thematic studies and other miscellaneous subjects. In addition, there are additional specialist teachers who teach separate classes covering science, theatrics, music, computer skills, and world languages (Mandarin or Spanish).

=== Upper school ===
The upper school, in contrast, has no homeroom teacher. Instead, each student takes seven different classes and moves around the classrooms throughout the day. Rather than storing all school supplies within a fixed desk, as the students do in lower school, upper school students have lockers as an area to store books and school supplies. The classes for the upper school are: science, a world language (either Spanish, Latin, or Mandarin), history, English, mathematics, P.E., art, theater, music (except in seventh grade), LEAP, and two electives. For electives, students may choose to attend one elective which meets four days per seven-day cycle, or two different two-day-per-cycle electives. On some afternoons, the upper school has a program called LEAP (Learning Enhancement and Achievement Program) which gives students the ability to choose which classes they attend from a list of approximately eight options each period. The primary purpose of LEAP is to support the academic and artistic programs by providing students time for working on class assignments or independent projects. Students can also select classes that enhance the learning in all of their classes. Throughout the year there are a variety of choices available for all of the upper school students. LEAP has been an important part of the upper school curriculum for the past 20 years. In addition, there is one "flex" period per seven-day cycle for seventh and eighth-graders, which can also be used for taking missed tests, working on class assignments, or getting extra help wherever it is needed.

== Student Life ==
=== Athletics ===
Starting in 4th grade, students have the option to participate in sports teams. Typically, teams are divided into higher and lower levels: navy is best, then blue, then gray. The school has a number of choices when it comes to athletics. Fall sports include coed football, girls basketball, and cross country. In the winter, students can choose between either boys basketball, girls soccer, and track training for 4th through 6th grades or boys soccer, boys basketball, girls soccer, and track training for 7th and 8th. During spring, students can choose to do dual sports or one out of track and volleyball.

=== Field trips ===
Beginning 3rd grade, students are invited to go on outdoor education field trips. Destinations listed below:

- 3rd grade: 1 day trip to Sacramento
- 4th grade: 2 night trip to Pali camp
- 5th grade: 2 night trip to The Outdoor School at Rancho Alegre
- 6th grade: 2 night trip to CELP Catalina
- 7th grade: 4 night trip to Washington DC
- 8th grade: 7 night trip to Costa Rica

== Notable alumni ==
=== Academics ===
- Benjamin Karney, Professor of Social Psychology at UCLA
- Eugene Volokh, Professor of Law at UCLA

=== Executives ===
- Nathan Myhrvold, Former CTO of Microsoft, co-founder of Intellectual Ventures

=== Actors ===
- Crispin Glover, actor
- Masi Oka, actor
- Kristy Wu, actress
- David Dorfman, actor
- Lilla Crawford, actress

=== Other notables ===
- Dana Berliner, Litigation Director at the Institute for Justice
- Christy Lemire, film critic and radio/podcast host
- Philippe Cousteau, Jr., grandson of Jacques Cousteau
- Charles Matthau, son of Walter Matthau
- Nick Sagan, son of Carl Sagan
- Sho Yano, child prodigy
- Madalyn Aslan, author
- Vivian Wilson, daughter of Elon Musk
