= Balamurali =

Balamurali is both a given name and a surname. Notable people with the name include:

- Aparna Balamurali (born 1995), Indian film actress and playback singer
- Balamurali Ambati (born 1977), American ophthalmologist, educator, and researcher
- Balamurali Balu, Indian film score composer and music producer
