= Stanley O. Gaines =

American psychologist

- Born: Stanley O. Gaines Jr.
- Education: Ph.D. in Psychology, University of Texas, 1991

Stanley O. Gaines is a social psychologist senior lecturer in the school of social sciences at Brunel University. Gaines is also an author, having written several books, including Culture, Ethnicity, and Personal Relationship Processes,, published by Routledge in 1997 (ISBN 9780415916530).

== Education ==
After earning a BSc in psychology from The University of Texas at Arlington, Gaines completed a PhD in the same field at The University of Texas at Austin in 1991.

After graduate school, he spent two years as a postdoctoral fellow and then served as an assistant professor of Psychology and Black Studies at Pomona College from 1992 to 2000. After his contract expired without being awarded tenure, Gaines alleged that this was a result of racial discrimination. He subsequently filed discrimination and retaliation complaints with the Equal Employment Opportunity Commission and went on a hunger strike to protest the decision, which was not overturned.

In 1996, he received a Ford Foundation fellowship to conduct research at the University of North Carolina in Chapel Hill.^{[references needed]} In 2000, Gaines was a Fulbright Scholar fellow at the University of the West Indies.

Since 2001, Gaines has been a senior lecturer at Brunel University. He is also a chair member of the International Association for Relationship Research, an Editorial Advisory Board member for the Journal of Social and Personal Relationships, and a research fellow for the University of Bath.

== Career ==
Gaines's research focuses on the links between objective poverty and individual experiences of inner well-being across time among married men and women, and single women heading households in rural villages within India and Zambia. His main areas of research include close relationships, culture and ethnicity, gender psychology, inter-group relations, interpersonal processes, personality, individual difference, prejudice and stereotyping, and research methods and assessment.

Gaines is also the author of Culture, Ethnicity, and Personal Relationship Processes, published by Routledge in 1997.

== Modelling Psychological Responses to the Great East Japan Earthquake and Nuclear Incident (2012) ==
In March 2011, a nuclear meltdown and an earthquake and major tsunami struck Eastern Japan. One study modeled individual differences in the risk perceptions of these events and their implications on behaviors. Data was collected from 844 young respondents in three regions of Japan (Miyagi, Tokyo, and Western Japan) between 11 and 133 weeks after the events. The study showed shared normative concerns about the earthquake and nuclear risks, along with conservation values, a lack of trust in government aid and advice, and poor personal control of the nuclear incident. All of these factors positively correlated with perceived earthquake and nuclear risks. Many of these perceptions predicted specific outcomes, such as relocating away from their homes or even leaving Japan

The study found significant relationships between the respondents' individual values, their normative concerns about their friends and family, their sense of control over the threats, and their trust in the government's aid. All of these risk perceptions predicted a change in preventative measures taken in the future, including various safety measures like keeping first aid kits, modifying living quarters, wearing masks, and contemplating leaving the country. There were significant differences between regions in how they responded to the threat. There was greater repeat earthquake anticipation in Tokyo, and behavioral changes were more prominent in areas affected by the March 2011 events. As far as risk perception was concerned, trust in the government also decreased after the events.

== Impact of Experiences with Racism on African-Descent Persons' Susceptibility to Stereotype Threat Within the United Kingdom (2008) ==
A study of 103 people in the United Kingdom examined the impact of individual, institutional, cultural, and collective racism on a person's susceptibility to stereotype threat among African-descent persons. The study found that experiences with these types of racism were not significantly related to the susceptibility to stereotype threat, contrary to the study's original hypothesis. The only significant indicator was experience with collective racism, which positively predicted susceptibility. This study dealt with implications for the continuing relevance of Erving Goffman's Symbolic Interactionist Theory and Construct of Stigma. It also related strongly to Claude Steele's construct of stereotype threat to the field of Black psychology.

While previous research on stereotype threat has mostly focused on academic aspects, this study focused on stereotype threat in a wider range of contexts throughout the United Kingdom. Stereotype threat refers to the anxiety and potentially impaired performance that comes from the social stigma of inferiority an individual believes has already been evaluated in their domain. The study was considered relatively novel, as most stereotype threat studies have been conducted in the United States. The hypothesis was that the UK, like the US, would have high rates of stereotype threat among African-descent people. In the study, 49 of the participants were men, and 64 were women, with an average age of 28.12 years. Participants were recruited using snowball sampling within the West London area. They were given a consent document and then asked to complete a survey about stereotype threat.

The most prominent finding from the study was the significant positive effect of experience with collective racism on an African-descent person's susceptibility to stereotype threat. This effect remained significant even after controlling for the other forms of racism. The study connected stereotype threat in modern times to a history where White mobs would target Black individuals as a form of collective racism. The other forms of racism were found to be insignificant, which was noted as surprising and unexpected.

== Awards ==
2018 IARR Book Award: Stanley O. Gaines Jr. received the International Association for Relationship Research (IARR) Book Award in 2018 for his book Personality and Close Relationship Processes, which was recognized for its significant contribution to the field of relationship research.

== Other references ==
- Plous, S. (2009, December 21). Stanley O. Gaines Jr. Retrieved November 17, 2012, from Social Psychology Network website: http://gaines.socialpsychology.org/research
- Gaines, Stanley O. Jr. (05/01/2012). "Impact of experiences with racism on African-descent persons' susceptibility to stereotype threat within the United Kingdom.". Journal of black psychology (0095-7984), 38 (2), p. 135.
- Gaines, S. (2013, March 8). Stanley Gaines. Retrieved November 14, 2013, from Brunel University, London website: http://www.brunel.ac.uk/sss/psychology/staff-profiles/stanley-gaines
- Gaines, S. O. (2000, July 18). Pomona College Statement on Dr. Gaines' Hunger Strike. Retrieved November 16, 2013, from Tripod website:http://gmoses.tripod.com/gaines/sgdoc003.htm
- Gaines, S. O. Jr. (1997). Culture, ethnicity, and personal relationship processes. New York: Routledge.
- Bunce, D.; Handley, R.; Gaines, S. O. Jr. (2008). "Depression, anxiety, and within-person variability in adults aged 18 to 85 years". Psychology and Aging. 23 (4): 848–858. doi:10.1037/a0013678. PMID 19140655.
- Gaines, S. O. Jr. (2004). "Color-line as fault-line: Teaching interethnic relations in California in the 21st century". Journal of Social Issues. 60: 175–193. doi:10.1111/j.0022-4537.2004.00105.x.
- Gaines, S. O. Jr. (2001). "Coping with prejudice: Romantic partners as sources of socioemotional support for stigmatized individuals". Journal of Social Issues. 57: 113–128. doi:10.1111/0022-4537.00204.
- Agnew, C. R.; Thompson, V. D.; Gaines, S. O. Jr. (2000). "Incorporating proximal and distal influences on prejudice: Testing a general model across outgroups". Personality and Social Psychology Bulletin. 26 (4): 403–418. doi:10.1177/0146167200266001. S2CID 144815702.
- Gaines, S. O. Jr.; Marelich, W. D.; Bledsoe, K. L.; Steers, W. N.; Henderson, M. C.; Granrose, C. S.; Barajas, L.; Hicks, D.; Lyde, M.; Takahashi, Y.; Yum, N.; Rios, D. I.; Garcia, B. F.; Farris, K.; Page, M. S. (1997). "Links between race/ethnicity and cultural values as mediated by racial/ethnic identity and moderated by gender". Journal of Personality and Social Psychology. 72 (6): 1460–1476. doi:10.1037/0022-3514.72.6.1460. PMID 9177025.
- Gaines, S. O. Jr.; Panter, A. T.; Lyde, M. C.; Steers, W. N.; Rusbult, C. E.; Cox, C. L.; Wexler, M. O. (1997). "Evaluating the circumplex of interpersonal traits and the manifestation of interpersonal traits in interpersonal trust". Journal of Personality and Social Psychology. 73 (3): 610–623. doi:10.1037/0022-3514.73.3.610. S2CID 46910601.
- Gaines, S. O. Jr.; Reed, E. S. (1995). "Prejudice: From Allport to Du Bois". American Psychologist. 50 (2): 96–103. doi:10.1037/0003-066x.50.2.96.
