= Stanley Gaines =

Stanley Gaines may refer to:

- Stanley O. Gaines, social psychologist
- Stanley F. Gaines, member of the Mississippi House of Representatives
