= Actor–partner interdependence model =

Statistical framework for analyzing data from dyads

The actor–partner interdependence model (APIM) is a statistical framework for analyzing data from dyads such as romantic partners, parents and children, friends, or other closely connected pairs. It is used for dyadic settings in which the two members’ responses are statistically non-independent. In this framework, associations within individuals (actor effects) and across partners (partner effects) are estimated in a single model.

APIM has been commonly used in social, developmental, clinical, and health psychology to study interpersonal processes including relationship satisfaction, conflict, parenting, health behaviors, and well-being. The model can be implemented in several statistical frameworks, most commonly multilevel models and structural equation models. The model has also been extended to include mediation, moderation, and longitudinal designs.

== Development ==
Early methodological discussions in social psychology raised concerns about non-independence in dyadic and group data, including work on separating individual- and group-level effects in nested data. Related work showed that ignoring non-independence can bias standard errors and statistical tests when data are analysed as if observations were independent. The social relations model provided a related methodological framework for representing interdependence as a component of interpersonal data.

Kenny, Kashy, and collaborators described a general approach in which each member’s outcome is predicted by both their own predictor and their partner’s predictor. Later accounts labelled and consolidated this framework as the actor–partner interdependence model, with comprehensive treatment in Dyadic Data Analysis.

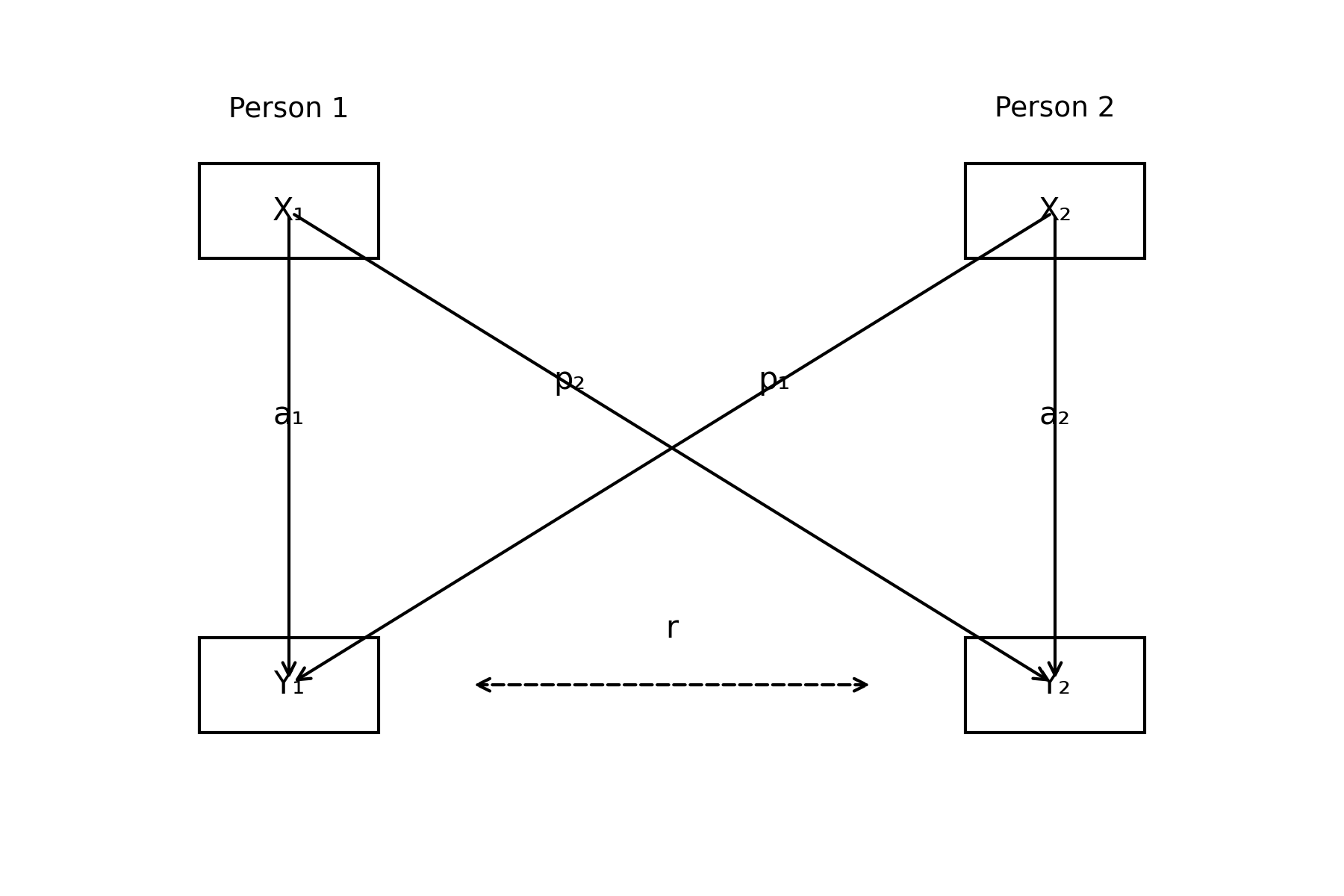
Basic path diagram of the APIM for distinguishable dyads. Solid arrows represent actor effects $a_1$ and $a_2$ and partner effects $p_1$ and $p_2$; the dashed double-headed arrow represents residual interdependence between outcomes.

== Conceptual overview ==
APIM is a framework for analyzing dyadic data in which each person’s outcome is modeled as a function of both partners’ predictors. An actor effect relates a person’s predictor to their own outcome, and a partner effect relates a person’s predictor to their partner’s outcome; both are estimated within the same model that includes predictors for both members. As an illustration from close-relationship research, a study of married couples found that individuals’ attachment anxiety was negatively associated with both their own marital satisfaction (actor effect) and their partner’s marital satisfaction (partner effect).

The model distinguishes between distinguishable and indistinguishable dyads. Distinguishable dyads have a meaningful way to label the two members (such as husband and wife, mother and child, or patient and clinician), and actor and partner effects can differ across roles. Indistinguishable (or exchangeable) dyads lack a theoretically meaningful variable that can consistently label members across dyads (e.g., two friends/roommates with no role-based distinction). For indistinguishable dyads, APIMs are typically specified by imposing equality constraints so that corresponding parameters are the same across members (e.g., $a_1=a_2$ and $p_1= p_2$; additional constraints on intercepts/means and variances are often used depending on the modeling framework). For indistinguishable (interchangeable) dyads, researchers often specify the model so that estimates are invariant to the arbitrary ordering of the two members in the dataset, typically by constraining corresponding parameters (e.g., actor/partner paths and, depending on the framework, intercepts and variances) to be equal. These equality constraints are used to ensure that estimates do not depend on the arbitrary labeling of dyad members in the dataset. Researchers often distinguish between conceptual distinguishability (whether a within-dyad categorical variable can label members) and empirical distinguishability (whether that distinction corresponds to differences in means, variances, or covariances), and empirical distinguishability can be evaluated rather than assumed.

A basic path diagram for a distinguishable dyad depicts two observed predictor variables $X_1$ and $X_2$ and two outcome variables $Y_1$ and $Y_2$, each representing one member of the dyad. Paths from $X_1$ to $Y_1$ and from $X_2$ to $Y_2$ represent actor effects (often labelled $a$), while paths from $X_1$ to $Y_2$ and from $X_2$ to $Y_1$ represent partner effects (often labelled $p$). The residuals of $Y_1$ and $Y_2$ are allowed to correlate to represent remaining interdependence after the predictors have been taken into account. This residual correlation can be interpreted as the portion of dyadic non-independence that remains after accounting for actor and partner predictors; as predictors are added, comparing unconditional and conditional variance–covariance estimates can be used to quantify how much non-independence is explained by the predictors.

Compared with running separate regression models for each partner and ignoring the correlation between their outcomes, APIM estimates actor and partner effects within a single system of equations and explicitly models residual interdependence between the two members. It differs from the social relations model, which decomposes interpersonal outcomes into actor, partner, and relationship components in designs such as round-robin data, and from common fate or other dyadic approaches that treat the dyad as a single higher-level unit. APIM focuses on estimating actor and partner associations (directed regression paths) between dyad members while accounting for non-independence in their outcomes.

== Model specification ==
In a simple APIM for distinguishable dyads with one predictor and one outcome per person, each member’s outcome is modeled as a function of their own predictor and their partner’s predictor, which can be written as two linked regression equations:

$$\begin{aligned}
Y_1 &= \alpha_1 + \beta_{A1} X_1 + \beta_{P1} X_2 + \varepsilon_1,\\
Y_2 &= \alpha_2 + \beta_{A2} X_2 + \beta_{P2} X_1 + \varepsilon_2.
\end{aligned}$$

Here $\beta_{A1}$ and $\beta_{A2}$ represent actor effects, and $\beta_{P1}$ and $\beta_{P2}$ represent partner effects. The two predictors are commonly allowed to correlate, and the residuals $\varepsilon_1$ and $\varepsilon_2$ are allowed to be correlated to represent remaining non-independence after the predictors have been taken into account.

For indistinguishable (interchangeable) dyads, APIMs are often specified by imposing equality constraints on corresponding parameters to reflect symmetry between members, such as equal intercepts and equal actor and partner effects (e.g., $\alpha_1 = \alpha_2$, $\beta_{A1} = \beta_{A2}$, $\beta_{P1} = \beta_{P2}$) These constraints are used to ensure that estimates do not depend on the arbitrary labeling or ordering of the two members in the dataset.

APIM can also be estimated within a structural equation modeling framework. When constructs are measured with multiple indicators, a latent-variable formulation can model predictors and outcomes as latent factors, which can help address measurement error, test equality constraints across dyad members, and embed APIM within larger models with additional predictors, outcomes, or higher-order constructs. When APIM is estimated with latent variables measured by multiple indicators, researchers may evaluate measurement invariance across dyad members to support comparisons across members. The level of invariance required depends on the intended inference; for example, comparing actor and partner effects across members in distinguishable dyads typically requires configural and loading invariance, whereas comparing means also requires intercept invariance. If the required invariance is not supported, conclusions about the corresponding member comparisons (e.g., mean differences) are typically interpreted with caution or not drawn.

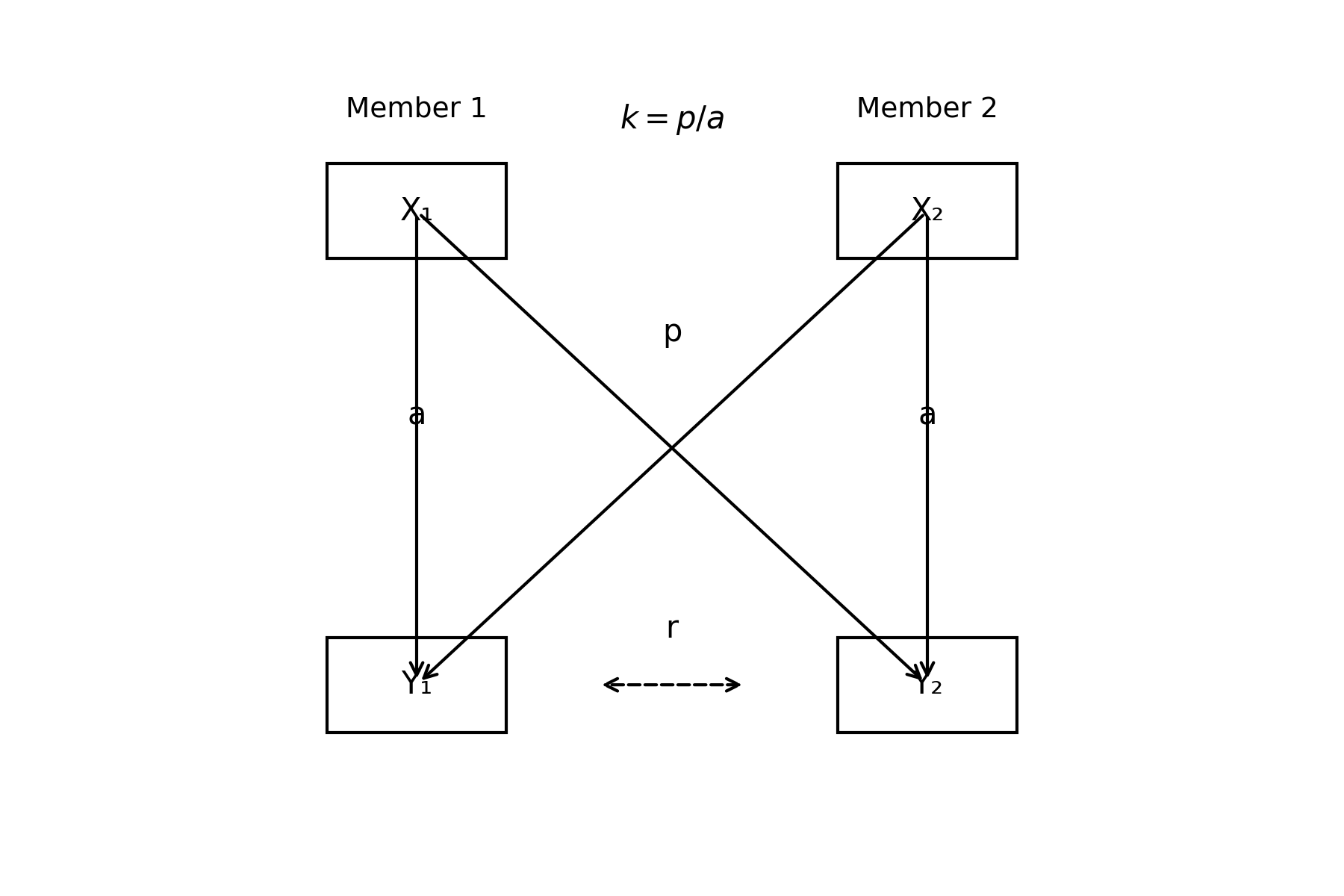
APIM for indistinguishable dyads. Actor $a$ and partner $p$ effects are constrained to be equal; the ratio $k=p/a$ summarises the relative size of partner to actor effects.

In one approach, Kenny and Ledermann described several interpretable configurations of actor and partner effects, including an “actor-only” pattern (partner effects constrained to zero), a “couple” pattern (actor and partner effects constrained to be similar in magnitude), and a “contrast” pattern (actor and partner effects constrained to have opposite signs). They proposed summarizing these configurations using the partner-to-actor ratio $k = \beta_P / \beta_A$, which can be used to conduct formal tests of whether the data are consistent with each pattern.

Standard APIM implementations draw on assumptions associated with the chosen estimation framework (e.g., linear regression or SEM), including a correctly specified functional form, independent dyads, and correctly specified distinguishability decisions and equality constraints. When outcomes are non-normal or categorical, alternative modeling and estimation approaches may be used, such as generalized linear mixed models or generalized estimating equations for dyadic categorical data, to better match distributional features of the outcome.

== Data requirements and estimation ==
APIM is used with dyadic data in which observations from two members are statistically non-independent, so sample size is typically described in terms of the number of dyads rather than the number of persons. In some inferential settings, authors describe an “effective sample size” that depends on the amount of within-dyad non-independence and can often fall between $N$ dyads (and $2N$ individuals), When data are stored in a double-entry ("pairwise") format, each dyad contributes two records; analyses may use case weights (e.g., weighting each record by one-half) or equivalent adjustments so that inference corresponds to $n$ dyads rather than $2n$ records.

Required sample size depends on the target parameters and the dependence structure, rather than following a single general threshold. For example, simulation-based sample-size work shows that, under the same design assumptions, the number of dyads needed to detect partner effects can be larger than the number needed to detect actor effects, and requirements can differ for distinguishable versus indistinguishable dyads. In one set of simulations, under a fixed set of design assumptions, partner effects were estimated to require substantially more dyads than actor effects to achieve comparable power, and indistinguishable dyads were estimated to require fewer dyads than distinguishable dyads under otherwise identical settings.

APIM is straightforward in standard two-person dyads (e.g., couples), but related models accommodate other interdependence structures, including one-with-many designs in which a focal person is linked to multiple partners .

Estimation can be implemented in several frameworks. With observed variables, APIM can be expressed as linked regression equations for the two members. It can be fit using multilevel models that treat individuals as nested within dyads, or structural equation models that estimate both members’ relations within a single model and make it convenient to impose equality constraints and represent measurement error. For categorical outcomes, APIM parameters have been estimated using generalized estimating equations for dyadic categorical data. In models that include interaction terms (e.g., moderated APIMs), centering moderators and related predictors is often used to aid interpretation and reduce collinearity between lower-order terms and product terms.

== Applications ==
In close-relationship research, the APIM is used to test how each partner’s characteristics relate to both their own outcomes and their partner’s outcomes while accounting for interdependence in dyadic data. In studies of emerging adults’ dating relationships, methodological primers have used APIM to illustrate hypotheses in which both actor and partner effects are of interest, including extensions that incorporate moderation and latent-variable interactions in a structural equation modeling framework. Empirical applications in marital research have similarly estimated actor and partner associations for relationship outcomes such as marital satisfaction, including tests of whether these associations vary as a function of moderators. In developmental and family research, APIM has been presented as a framework for studying longitudinal, bidirectional influences within dyads. For example, Cook and Kenny illustrate APIM with longitudinal mother–adolescent dyads to examine how each member’s prior state predicts later outcomes for both the same person (actor paths) and the partner (partner paths), and they discuss tests of whether influence is bidirectional (i.e., whether both partner effects are supported).

APIM has also been applied outside close-relationship and family contexts to other two-person interaction settings. For example, health services research has applied APIM to physician–patient dyads using each party’s reported shared decision-making behaviors to model post-consultation uncertainty, and has discussed measurement and interpretation issues relevant to detecting partner effects.

== Extensions and variants ==
Extensions of the basic APIM address cases where effects are indirect, conditional, or unfold over time, and where outcome distributions or data structures depart from the linear two-person setting. A mediated extension (often termed the APIMeM) adds a mediator for each member and decomposes effects into within-person and cross-partner indirect pathways (actor–actor, actor–partner, partner–actor, and partner–partner).

Moderated formulations test whether actor and partner effects depend on a third variable. For distinguishable dyads, moderators can be specified as within-dyad, between-dyad, or mixed variables, with corresponding constraints and interpretations that differ by moderator type. When moderation is applied to latent-variable APIMs, interaction terms can be defined at the latent level to evaluate conditional actor and partner effects without treating measurement error as zero.

Longitudinal APIMs incorporate lagged actor and partner paths so that each member’s prior state can predict later outcomes for themselves and their partner; variants for intensive longitudinal designs have been formulated within dynamic structural equation modeling. In over-time or intensive longitudinal APIMs, grand-mean or person-mean centering of time-varying predictors is commonly recommended; when person-mean centering is used, including both members’ person means as additional predictors allows separation of within-person and between-person actor and partner effects and clarifies interpretation of the intercept.

Additional variants adapt estimation to non-Gaussian outcomes and to more complex dependence structures. For example, generalized estimating equations have been used to estimate actor and partner effects for categorical dyadic outcomes. More complex sampling and nesting structures (e.g., dyads embedded in higher-level contexts) are often handled using multilevel or related modeling frameworks for dyadic and group data.

A related approach that models dyad-level shared variance directly is the common fate model for dyadic data.

== Criticisms and limitations ==
Methodological discussions note that the APIM is often used as a default dyadic model, although other structures (e.g., common-fate or mutual-influence models) may better match the underlying source of non-independence in some research questions. In addition, APIM parameters are frequently described as “influence” paths, but in many designs they may represent predictive associations rather than causal effects. For mediation extensions, model fit and parameter estimates do not by themselves establish the correct causal ordering because alternative statistically equivalent models can imply different substantive interpretations.

Practical limitations also concern statistical power and model specification (model misspecification). Simulation-based power analyses indicate that, at sample sizes common in applied work, tests of partner effects and especially indirect effects can be underpowered relative to actor effects. In the basic APIM, the fully estimated model is saturated (just-identified), so conventional global fit indices are not informative unless additional constraints are imposed. For indistinguishable dyads estimated in an SEM framework, overall fit is commonly evaluated using interchangeability-adjusted model tests. In this approach, the specified model is compared to an “interchangeable-and-saturated” baseline (ISAT), and test statistics (e.g., $\chi^2$ and degrees of freedom) are adjusted by taking differences relative to ISAT. Finally, omitted interaction terms (e.g., actor × partner effects) can distort effect-size estimates, inflate standard errors, and bias main-effect coefficients, and some estimation frameworks impose constraints on the sign of the non-independence parameter (e.g., random-intercept approaches cannot represent negative covariances).

== Software and resources ==
APIMs have been estimated using both structural equation modeling (SEM) and multilevel (mixed-effects) modeling approaches. In SEM implementations, actor and partner paths are specified jointly for the two dyad members, and additional constraints may be imposed when dyad members are treated as indistinguishable (interchangeable). In multilevel implementations, individuals are modeled as nested within dyads (via a dyad identifier), and standard mixed-model software has been used to estimate actor and partner effects under this framework.

Outcome type and study design can motivate alternative estimation strategies. For categorical dyadic outcomes, GEE-based APIM formulations have been described with worked examples (including SPSS and SAS implementations), and generalized linear mixed modeling provides another route to modeling non-Gaussian outcomes in dyadic settings. For longitudinal dyadic data, variants of the APIM can be implemented within dynamic SEM approaches in software such as Mplus.

In addition to general-purpose statistical software, several web-based resources provide instructional materials and interactive interfaces for estimating APIM variants and for planning studies. Kenny’s dyadic analysis website and the DyadR project provide example code and web applications for dyadic (and group) data analysis. Web-based interfaces have also been developed for fitting APIMs in an SEM framework (e.g., APIM_SEM). Power and sample-size planning for APIM studies is often addressed using simulation-based methods and dedicated calculators, because required dyad counts can differ across target parameters (e.g., actor vs. partner effects) and across model variants. One example is the APIMPower tool, which provides web-based power analysis for APIM designs.

== See also ==
- Dyad
- Interdependence
- Multilevel model
- Structural equation modeling
- Generalized estimating equation
- Mediation
- Moderation
- Cross-lagged panel model
