= John Harvey (psychologist) =

American social psychologist

- Born: John Harlan Harvey; September 28, 1943 (age 82); McKinney, Texas
- Education: University of South Carolina; University of Missouri
- Awards: Distinguished Career Award from the International Society for the Study of Personal Relationships (2000)
- Scientific career
- Fields: Social psychology
- Workplaces: Texas Tech University; University of Iowa
- Thesis: Determinants of the perception of choice (1971)
- Doctoral advisor: Judson Mills

John H. Harvey (born September 28, 1943) is an American social psychologist and Professor Emeritus in the Department of Psychological & Brain Sciences at the University of Iowa. He was elected to the Society of Experimental Social Psychology in 1976. He was named a fellow of the American Psychological Association in 1978 and the American Psychological Society in 1991. He served as the founding editor-in-chief of the Journal of Social and Clinical Psychology from 1983 to 1988. In 2000, he received the Distinguished Career Award from the International Society for the Study of Personal Relationships.

During his tenure at the University of Iowa, Harvey conducted research on account-making and loss with postdoctoral fellow Terri L. Orbuch, co-authoring works on social psychology and close relationships.
