= Sho Yano =

American physician (born 1990)

- Born: Yano Shō; 1990 (age 35–36); Portland, Oregon, United States
- Occupation: Physician
- Years active: 1993–present

Sho Timothy Yano (矢野 祥, Yano Shō; born 1990) is an American physician. Yano is a former child prodigy who entered Loyola University Chicago at the age of nine.

== Early life and education ==
Yano's mother, Kyung, is originally from South Korea, while his father, Katsura, is originally from Japan. Yano reportedly was reading by age two, writing by age three, playing classical music on the piano at age four, and composing by age five. He went to the Mirman School as a child.

After scoring 1500 out of 1600 on the SAT at age eight, he graduated from the American School of Correspondence at age nine then entered Loyola University Chicago also at age nine, graduating summa cum laude at age 12. He then entered the Pritzker School of Medicine at the University of Chicago in the MSTP (Medical Scientist Training Program), which is designed for those seeking to earn an MD and PhD. He was awarded a doctorate in molecular genetics and cell biology there in 2009, at the age of 18. He entered his third year of medical school at the University of Chicago in 2009, becoming at age 21 the youngest person to graduate with an MD from the University of Chicago, for which he has been called a "real-life Doogie Howser". He became a pediatric neurology resident at the University of Chicago.

According to Yano, he owes much of his success to his mother, who noticed his superior intellectual capabilities at an early age and helped encourage and motivate him through rigorous academic enrichment. His mother also homeschooled him through the 12th grade, saying she felt other students his age would not be as interested in their studies. Sho's younger sister Sayuri (born 1996) also exhibits prodigious talents in both academic studies and music; she graduated Roosevelt University in 2010 with a Bachelor of Science in biology degree. She later became a Bachelor of Music student majoring in violin performance at the Peabody Institute of The Johns Hopkins University.

== See also ==
- Balamurali Ambati
- Michael Kearney
