= Vulnerability-Stress-Adaptation Model =

The Vulnerability-Stress-Adaptation (VSA) Model is a framework in relationship science for conceptualizing the dynamic processes of marriage, created by Benjamin Karney and Thomas Bradbury. The VSA Model emphasizes the consideration of multiple dimensions of functioning, including couple members' enduring vulnerabilities, experiences of stressful events, and adaptive processes, to account for variations in marital quality and stability over time. The VSA model was a departure from past research considering any one of these themes separately as a contributor to marital outcomes, and integrated these separate factors into a single, cohesive framework in order to best explain how and why marriages change over time. In adherence with the VSA model, in order to achieve a complete understanding of marital phenomenon, research must consider all dimensions of marital functioning, including enduring vulnerabilities, stress, and adaptive processes simultaneously.

== Overarching hypothesis ==
The VSA Model posits that couples who have few enduring vulnerabilities, encounter few stressors, and employ effective adaptive processes are likely to experience high marital quality and stability, while couples who have many enduring vulnerabilities, encounter many stressors, and employ ineffective adaptive processes will experience declining marital quality and/or divorce.

== Foundational perspectives ==
The VSA Model is an integration of the foundational perspectives of social exchange theory of behavior, attachment theory, crisis theory, and the diathesis stress model.
Consideration of social exchange theory of behavior: The VSA model states that behavioral exchanges and relationship quality reciprocally influence one another, such that spouses' (1) behavioral exchanges in the marriage lead to changes in marital satisfaction, and that (2) relationship satisfaction influences couple members' behavioral exchanges.

Consideration of attachment theory:The VSA model considers how stable personal characteristics can elicit the experience of stressful life events and can affect couples' ability to adapt to the marital difficulties these stressors breed.

Consideration of crisis theory: The VSA model accounts for the different kinds of life events and circumstances couples can face, and considers both how these stressors influence spouses' behavioral exchanges, and how these behavioral exchanges used to manage encountered stressors can serve to heighten or mitigate their effects.

Considerations of diathesis–stress model: The VSA model accounts for the association between individual/couple vulnerability and capacity to manage stress as it emerges.

== Paths of the VSA Model ==
=== Path A: Stressful events to adaptive processes ===
Several studies have shown that stressors affect the ways couple members behave with one another.

==== Examples of Path A ====
1) Research has shown that unemployment in a blue-collar worker population and increases in the daily workload of air traffic controllers covary with more negative behavioral exchanges between spouses.

2) A daily diary study revealed that when individual experience more stress on a given day, they are more likely to describe their interactions with their partners as negative.

=== Path B: Enduring vulnerabilities to adaptive processes ===
Spouses' enduring vulnerabilities reduce or enhance their capacity to adapt to stressful circumstances.

==== Examples of Path B ====
1) Research has shown that couple members' experiences in childhood are linked with the quantity of complaints about their own marital relationships and with attitudes towards marriage in general.

2) Studies have shown that children whose parents divorced exhibited weaker social skills as adults.

3) Research has shown that spouses' education and personality traits are associated with the quality of their behavioral exchanges with one another.

=== Path C: Enduring vulnerabilities to stressful events ===
Individuals' enduring vulnerabilities can breed new stressors.

==== Examples of Path C ====
1) Personality traits are concurrently associated with frequency of negative life events.

2) Negative affectivity is cross-sectionally associated with experiencing life events as more stressful.

3) The stress-generation model of depression states that chronically depressed individuals can generate stressors in their lives that then exacerbate their depressive symptoms, perpetuating the cycle of depression.

=== Path D: Stressful events due to chance variables ===
Stressful events can occur simply due to chance, rather than as a result of any characteristics of the couple or its individual members.

=== Path E: Adaptive processes to stressful events ===
Spouses' adaptive processes serve to manage stressful events, and have the ability to worsen or alleviate stressors.

==== Examples of Path E ====
1) Research has shown that lower marital quality predicts longer periods of recovery from heart attacks, and it is likely that the behaviors exchanged between patients and their spouses mediate this effect.

2) Longitudinal research on individuals with major depressive disorder has shown that participants with critical spouses are more likely experience relapses in depressive symptomatology than were participants with less critical spouses.

=== Path F: Adaptive processes to marital quality ===
Behavioral exchanges when couple members are problem-solving or supporting one another is associated with changes in marital quality, and more research is shifting its focus to understanding the mechanisms by which behavior impacts marital quality.

==== Examples of Path F ====
1) Research shows that physiological arousal resulting from anticipation of a conflict discussion predicts declines in marital satisfaction.

2) Research has suggested that negative communication can hold positive implications for relationship quality if spouses view the conflict interaction as the way to resolve a problem.

3) Research has suggested that couples might learn to avoid certain topics of conversation in order to maintain high levels of relationship quality.

=== Path G: Marital quality to adaptive processes ===
Perceptions of marital quality can affect spouses' capabilities to effectively problem-solve, provide emotional support to one another, and manage external stressors.

==== Examples of Path G ====
1) Research has revealed that wives of more satisfied husbands became more affectionate over time, and husbands of more satisfied wives became less negative over time. This demonstrates spouses' behavior changing as a result of their partners' level of satisfaction.

=== Path H: Marital quality to marital stability ===
Declines in marital quality increase the likelihood of marital instability.

== Examples of applications in research ==
=== Physical aggression ===
Researchers used the VSA framework to explore physical aggression as a time-varying process that is influenced by couple members' vulnerabilities and contextual factors.

Variables applied to the model:

Enduring Vulnerabilities: Personality Traits

Stress: Chronic Stress

Adaptive Processes: Physical Aggression

Paths tested

Path A: Stress (chronic stress) to adaptive processes (physical aggression)

Path B: Enduring Vulnerabilities (personality traits) to adaptive processes (physical aggression)

Path C: Enduring vulnerabilities (personality traits) to stress (chronic stress)

Path E: Adaptive processes (physical aggression) to stress (chronic stress)

=== Dyadic coping ===
Researchers used the VSA framework to explore associations between dyadic coping, stressful events, marital standards, and marital quality and stability.

Variables applied to the model

Enduring Vulnerabilities: marital standards

Stress: stressful events

Adaptive processes: dyadic coping

Marital Quality

Marital stability

Paths tested

Path A: Stress (stressful events) to adaptive processes (dyadic coping)

Path B: Enduring Vulnerabilities (marital standards) to adaptive processes (dyadic coping)

Path C: Enduring vulnerabilities (marital standards) to stress (stressful events)

Path E: Adaptive processes (physical aggression) to stress (chronic stress)

Path F: Adaptive processes (dyadic coping) to marital quality

Path G: Marital quality to adaptive processes dyadic coping

Path H: Marital quality to marital stability

=== Military marriages ===
Researchers used the VSA framework to explore associations between individual/couple vulnerabilities, stress associated with deployment, adaptive processes, including communication and management of change, and emotional intimacy.

Variables applied to the model

Enduring Vulnerabilities: PTSD symptoms

Stress: Stress associated with deployment

Adaptive processes: managing transition of deployment; communication to maintain emotional intimacy

Marital quality

Paths tested

Path A: Stress (deployment stress) to adaptive processes (communication, transition management)

Path B: Enduring Vulnerabilities (PTSD symptoms) to adaptive processes (communication, transition management)

Path C: Enduring vulnerabilities (PTSD symptoms) to stress (deployment stress)

Path F: Adaptive processes (communication, transition management) to marital quality
