= Madalyn Aslan =

American astrologer, writer

- Born: October 5, 1963 (age 62); San Francisco
- Education: The Mirman School; South Hampstead Girls' School; Cornell University
- Occupations: Author; Astrologer
- Website: madalynaslan.com

Madalyn Todd Aslan (born October 5, 1963) is an American-British writer, astrologer, and palmist. She is the author of What's Your Sign?, Madalyn Aslan's Jupiter Signs, and the forthcoming Naked Mother. A The New York Times article called her a "love psychic".
