= Journal of Social and Clinical Psychology =

- Discipline: Social psychology; Clinical psychology
- Language: English
- Edited by: Thomas Joiner

Publication details
- History: 1983–present
- Publisher: Guilford Press
- Frequency: Bimonthly
- Impact factor: 1.946 (2020)

Standard abbreviations
- ISO 4: J. Soc. Clin. Psychol.

Indexing
- CODEN: JSCPFF
- ISSN: 0736-7236 (print); 1943-2771 (web)
- LCCN: 83645542
- OCLC no.: 300709538

Links
- Journal homepage; Online access; Online archive

The Journal of Social and Clinical Psychology is a bimonthly peer-reviewed scientific journal covering social and clinical psychology. It was established in 1983 by John Harvey and is published by Guilford Press. The editor-in-chief is Thomas Joiner (Florida State University). According to the Journal Citation Reports, the journal has a 2020 impact factor of 1.946.
