= Pali Adventures =

Summer camp in Southern California

- Location: San Bernardino Mountains, Running Springs, Southern California
- Type: Sleep-away summer camp
- Established: 1990
- Website: paliadventures.com

Pali Adventures is a sleep-away summer camp located in Southern California, United States. It offers a variety of specialty programs designed to provide immersive experiences in areas such as acting, filmmaking, culinary arts, and extreme sports.

== History ==
Pali Adventures was established in 1990 by Andy Wexler, who was inspired by his own childhood camp experience. Wexler launched the summer day camp in Southern California with a vision to enhance fun, personalized, and educational experiences. It evolved from a being a small day camp to a notable overnight camp with diverse specialty programs focused on camper choice and unique adventures in a safe environment.

== Reception and recognition ==
Pali Adventures has gained national attention for its unique approach to summer programs, blending traditional camp activities with specialized tracks that allow children to pursue their personal interests in a structured environment.

In 2012, The New York Times described Pali Adventures as "a camp where extreme is the name of the game", highlighting its offerings in stunts, trapeze, and motorsports. Business Insider included it in a list of "unusual summer camps" for its broad range of activities beyond conventional camping experiences.

The camp has also been featured by CBS News, ABC News, and the Los Angeles Times for its sleep-away programs and specialty camps, including a culinary track where campers learn advanced cooking skills.

Pali Adventures was recognized as one of the top summer camps in the United States in Newsweek's 2023 rankings.
