= Benjamin Karney =

American academic

Benjamin Karney (born 1968) is an American professor of social psychology at the University of California, Los Angeles and an adjunct behavioral scientist at the Rand Corporation. His research is on interpersonal relationships and marriage, examining the effects of stress on marital processes, divorce rates in military marriages, intimate relationships among youth and young adults, and marriage in low-income populations.

== Early life and education ==
Karney was born in 1968 in Los Angeles, to German and Israeli immigrants. Karney attended Mirman School for the Gifted and Harvard High School.

Karney attended Harvard University, where he was a tenor in The Harvard-Radcliffe Veritones and did theater; Karney played Tommy Judd in a production of Another Country. He graduated magna cum laude, Phi Beta Kappa, with a degree in psychology in 1990. His most influential teacher at Harvard was Roger Brown, who inspired Karney to apply to the University of California, Los Angeles, social psychology program. He was also influenced by the work of Kurt Lewin and Stanley Milgram. Karney received the American Psychological Association (APA) dissertation award for his work on how marriages changes: theoretical, methodological, and empirical considerations.

== Career ==
Karney achieved his Ph.D. in social psychology from in June 1997, working with Thomas Bradbury. The same year, he accepted a position as an assistant professor of social psychology at the University of Florida (UF). Karney has been honored by the professional community and received several awards, including the New Scholar Award from the International Network on Personal Relationships and, in 1996 and 1998, the Reuben Hill Research and Theory Award from the National Council on Family Relations. During his tenure at UF, he was given the Gerald R. Miller Award for Early Career Achievement by the International Association for Relationship Research and the Early Career Award by the Relationship Researchers Interest Group of the Society for Personality and Social Psychology. Karney was also recognized by UF's Department of Psychology as a distinguished teacher. In 2004, Karney returned to Los Angeles, and since 2007 has been a professor of Social Psychology in the Department of Psychology at the University of California (UCLA). With Thomas Bradbury, Karney co-directs the Relationship Institute at UCLA. Karney currently serves on several editorial boards and reviews grants for the National Institute of Mental Health.

Karney has received grant support from the National Science Foundation, National Institute of Mental Health, Administration for Children and Families, United States Department of Defense, and the Fetzer Institute.

== Books ==
Bradbury, T. N. & Karney, B. R. (2010). Intimate Relationships. New York: W. W. Norton.

== Personal life ==
At UCLA, he was the faculty sponsor for the Scattertones a cappella group.

== See also ==
- Vulnerability-Stress-Adaptation Model
