= Balamurali Ambati =

Indian ophthalmologist, educator and researcher

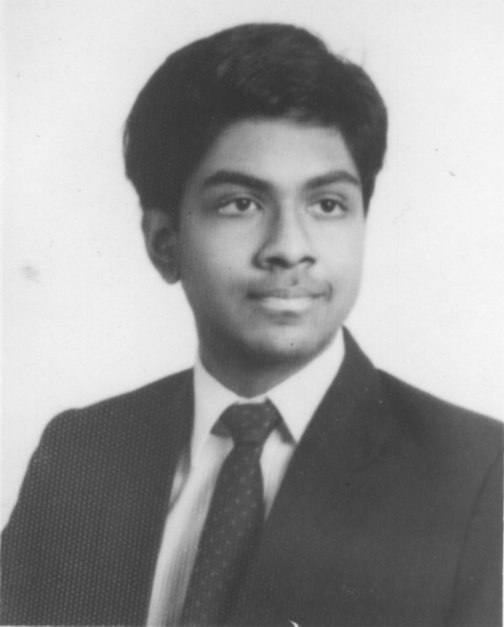
- Ambati Balamurali Krishna
- Born: Balamurali Krishna Ambati; July 29, 1977 (age 49); Vellore, Tamil Nadu, India
- Education: New York University; Harvard University; Duke University
- Website: doctorambati.com

Balamurali Krishna "Bala" Ambati (born July 29, 1977) is an Indian-American ophthalmologist, educator, and researcher. On May 19, 1995, he entered the Guinness Book of World Records as the world's youngest doctor, at the age of 17 years, 294 days.

== Biography ==
Ambati was born into a Telugu family in Vellore, Tamil Nadu in southern India. His family moved to Buffalo, New York when he was three. According to his parents, Ambati was doing calculus at the age of four. The family later moved to Orangeburg, South Carolina, and then to Baltimore, Maryland. Ambati initially attended high school at Baltimore Polytechnic Institute before transferring to Baltimore City College, graduating in 1989 at age 11. Also at age 11, he co-authored a research book on HIV/AIDS titled AIDS: The True Story – A Comprehensive Guide. He graduated from New York University at the age of 13. He graduated from Mount Sinai School of Medicine with distinction at the age of 17, scoring above 99 percent on his National Medical Boards, and becoming the world's youngest doctor in 1995.

Ambati expressed that he disliked being compared to Doogie Howser, the fictional teenage doctor. Ambati described himself as being popular with people and, standing 6 feet tall, did not appear too young for a career in medicine; when he entered medical school at 14 years old he looked just like the other medical students.

He completed an ophthalmology residency at Harvard University, where he developed strategies to reverse corneal angiogenesis after becoming a winner at the Westinghouse Science Talent Search and the International Science & Engineering Fair and becoming a National Merit Scholar. He received the prestigious Raja-Lakshmi Award in 1995 from Sri Raja-Lakshmi Foundation, Chennai.

After completing a fellowship in cornea and refractive surgery at Duke University in 2002, he joined the faculty of the Medical College of Georgia, where he practiced clinical ophthalmology and conducted research in such areas as corneal angiogenesis and outcomes of corneal and refractive surgery.

He also volunteers with the ORBIS Flying Eye Hospital, traveling to under-privileged countries to practice and teach ophthalmic surgery. In 2008, he earned a PhD in Cell Biology from the Medical College of Georgia. In 2011, Ambati donated a kidney to a 16-year-old boy from Idaho.

From 2008 to 2016, Ambati worked at the Moran Eye Center and served as professor of ophthalmology and visual sciences, adjunct associate professor of neurobiology and anatomy, and director of corneal research at the University of Utah School of Medicine. As of 2017, he practices in Eugene, Oregon at Pacific Clear Vision Institute.

He has been Professor & Director of Ophthalmology and Visual Sciences at University of Oregon's Knight Campus for Accelerating Scientific Impact since 2020.

== Family ==
Ambati's father's name was Ambati Rao and was an industrial engineer, while his mother was a math teacher.

Balamurali wrote a book on AIDS at age 11 with his brother Jayakrishna, who is also a physician.

== Awards ==
He won the Ludwig von Sallmann Clinician-Scientist Award from the ARVO Foundation in 2014 and the Troutman-Véronneau Prize from the Pan-American Association of Ophthalmology in 2013. He was also awarded the Fourth IRDS Awards for Medicine for his achievements, awarded by the Lucknow-based Institute for Research and Documentation in Social Sciences (IRDS).

== See also ==
- Child prodigy
- Sho Yano
