= Cross-lagged panel model =

Statistical model comparing multiple variables over time

== Summary ==
The cross-lagged panel model is a type of discrete time structural equation model used to analyze panel data in which two or more variables are repeatedly measured at two or more different time points. This model aims to estimate the directional effects that one variable has on another at different points in time. This model was first introduced in 1963 by Donald T. Campbell and refined during the 1970s by David A. Kenny. Kenny has described it as follows: "Two variables, X and Y, are measured at two times, 1 and 2, resulting in four measures, X1, Y1, X2, and Y2. With these four measures, there are six possible relations among them – two synchronous or cross‐sectional relations (see cross‐sectional design) (between X1 and Y1 and between X2 and Y2), two stability relations (between X1 and X2 and between Y1 and Y2), and two cross‐lagged relations (between X1 and Y2 and between Y1 and X2)."

=== Data Assumptions ===
Though this approach is commonly believed to be a valid technique to identify causal relationships from panel data, its use for this purpose has been criticized, as it depends on certain assumptions, such as synchronicity and stationarity, that may not be valid.

Data requirements also typically included continuous, non-count, data but there are approaches that support binary and ordinal data, with appropriate sample sizes.
