= Personal Relationships =

- Discipline: Psychology, Communication studies, Sociology, Family studies, Gerontology, Social work, Family therapy, Ethnography
- Language: English
- Edited by: Sylvia Niehuis

Publication details
- History: 1994-present
- Publisher: John Wiley & Sons on behalf of the International Association for Relationship Research
- Frequency: Quarterly
- Impact factor: 2.2 (2024)

Standard abbreviations
- ISO 4: Pers. Relatsh.

Indexing
- CODEN: PRRLEY
- ISSN: 1350-4126 (print); 1475-6811 (web)
- LCCN: 94657668
- OCLC no.: 173431276

Links
- Journal homepage; Online access; Online archive

Personal Relationships is a quarterly peer-reviewed academic journal published by John Wiley & Sons on behalf of the International Association for Relationship Research. It covers research on all aspects of personal relationships, using methods from psychology, sociology, communication studies, family studies, developmental psychology, social work, gerontology, and anthropology. It was established in 1994 by Cambridge University Press and the Editor-in-Chief is Sylvia Niehuis (Texas Tech University).

== Abstracting and indexing ==
The journal is abstracted and indexed in:

- Academic Search (EBSCO Publishing)
- Academic Search Alumni Edition (EBSCO Publishing)
- Academic Search Premier (EBSCO Publishing)
- CatchWord (Publishing Technology)
- Criminal Justice Collection (GALE Cengage)
- Current Contents: Social & Behavioral Sciences (Clarivate Analytics)
- Health Research Premium Collection (ProQuest)
- InfoTrac (GALE Cengage)
- Journal Citation Reports/Social Science Edition (Clarivate Analytics)
- ProQuest Central (ProQuest)
- ProQuest Central K-437
- Psychology & Behavioral Sciences Collection (EBSCO Information Services)
- Psychology Collection (GALE Cengage)
- Psychology Database (ProQuest)
- PsycINFO/Psychological Abstracts (American Psychological Association)
- Social Sciences Citation Index (Clarivate Analytics)
- SocINDEX (EBSCO Information Services)
- Sociological Collection (EBSCO Information Services)

According to Journal Citation Reports, Personal Relationships has a 2024 Impact Factor of 2.2, ranking it 60th out of 229 journals in the category "Communication", 39th out of 78 journals in the category "Social Psychology", and 19th out of 66 journals in the category "Family Studies".
