= Journal of Social and Personal Relationships =

- Discipline: Family studies, social psychology
- Language: English
- Edited by: Melissa Curran

Publication details
- History: 1984-present
- Publisher: SAGE Publications
- Frequency: 8/year
- Impact factor: 2.3 (2024)

Standard abbreviations
- ISO 4: J. Soc. Pers. Relatsh.

Indexing
- CODEN: JSRLE9
- ISSN: 0265-4075 (print); 1460-3608 (web)
- LCCN: 97652884
- OCLC no.: 10643317

Links
- Journal homepage; Online access; Online archive

The Journal of Social and Personal Relationships is a peer-reviewed academic journal covering research on social and personal relationships. It was established in 1984 by SAGE Publications, originally in association with the International Network on Personal Relationships, which merged with the International Society for the Study of Personal Relationships to form the International Association for Relationship Research. The editor-in-chief is Emily Scheinfeld, PhD (Kennesaw State University).

== Abstracting and indexing ==
The journal is abstracted and indexed in Scopus and Social Sciences Citation Index. According to the Journal Citation Reports, the journal has a 2024 impact factor of 2.3.
