= International Association for Relationship Research =

International learned society

- Abbreviation: IARR
- Formation: April 2, 2004; 22 years ago
- Merger of: International Network on Personal Relationships; International Society for the Study of Personal Relationships
- Type: Interdisciplinary
- Legal status: Non-profit organization
- Purpose: Research
- President: Stanley Gaines
- President-Elect: Leah Bryant
- Past-President: Susan Boon
- Board of directors: Jessica Eckstein (Treasurer), Cheryl Harasymchuk (Secretary), Pam Lannutti (Publications Chair), Emre Selçuk (Member at Large), Sara Parsafar (New Professional Representative)
- Key people: Committee Chairs: Luke Russell (Archivist), Erin Basinger (Awards), Michael Cunningham (Continuing Education, Ad Hoc), Sylvia Niehuis (Communication & Media Relations), Matthew Rivas-Koehl (Diversity, Equity, & Inclusion), Susan Boon (Elections), Jessica Eckstein (Finance), Daniel Perlman (Finance Advisor & History Task Force), Katarzyna Adamczyk (Future Conferences), Dominika Ochnik (Harassment Ad Hoc), Silvia Donato (Internationalization), Pingkan Rumondor (Membership), Kellie Brisini & Lisa Neff (Mentoring Co-Chairs), Julie Verette Lindenbaum (Teaching), Stuart Jankelovitz (Website Coordinator) Editors: Melissa Curran (Journal of Social and Personal Relationships), Ashley Randall (Personal Relationships), Elaine Scharfe (Relationship Research News), Terri Orbuch (Advances in Personal Relationships)
- Website: www.iarr.org

The International Association for Relationship Research (IARR) is an international, interdisciplinary learned society dedicated to promoting research on personal relationships. It was formed in 2004 from the merger of the International Network on Personal Relationships (INPR) and the International Society for the Study of Personal Relationships (ISSPR). Its official peer-reviewed journals are Personal Relationships and the Journal of Social and Personal Relationships. IARR also sponsors the Advances in Personal Relationships book series and publishes a newsletter called Relationship Research News.

== Organizational aims ==
IARR proclaims a commitment to diversity, equity, and inclusion and also to expanding access to researchers and research populations beyond Western, Educated, Industrialized, Rich, Democratic (WEIRD) nations, as a way of better understanding relationship processes. According to the organization's website (as of May 8, 2024), "it is imperative that the experiences of diverse people and relationship styles and structures are understood through the lens of a myriad of cultures and disciplines." The organization further states that, "Geographical, linguistic, and cultural diversity are essential for understanding how interpersonal relationships are experienced across the globe." The organization sponsors the Advances in Personal Relationships book series published by Cambridge University Press, edited by Terri L. Orbuch.

== Past conferences ==
Year	City	Country	Topic	Type
2002	Halifax, NS	Canada		Main Conference
2003	Normal, IL	USA	Compassionate Love	Mini-Conference
2004	Madison, WI	USA		Main Conference
2005	Vitoria	Brazil	Close Relationship Research in Brazil and South America	Mini-Conference
2005	Indianapolis, IN	USA	Exploring Relationships in Health or Health of Relationships	Mini-Conference
2006	Rethymnon, Crete	Greece		Main Conference
2007	Melbourne	Australia	Generations of Relationships and Relationships Across Generations	Mini-Conference
2008	Providence, RI	USA		Main Conference
2009	Lawrence, KS	USA	New Directions in Research on Close Relationships: Integrating Across Disciplines and Theoretical Approaches	Mini-Conference
2009	Brisbane	Australia	Connecting Research and Practice in Relationships	Annual Conference of the APS Psychology of Relationships Interest Group
2010	Herzliya	Israel		Main Conference
2010	Brisbane	Australia		Annual Conference of the APS Psychology of Relationships Interest Group
2011	Gdansk	Poland	Relationships Development, Maintenance, and Dissolution	Mini-Conference
2011	Tucson, AZ	USA	Health, Emotion, and Relationships	Mini-Conference
2011	Adelaide	Australia		Annual Conference of the APS Psychology of Relationships Interest Group
2012	Chicago, IL	USA		Main Conference
2012	Adelaide	Australia		Annual Conference of the APS Psychology of Relationships Interest Group
2013		Brazil	Conference on Personal Relationships	
2013	Louisville, KY	USA	Multi-Level Motivations in Close Relationship Dynamics	Mini-Conference and New Scholars Pre-Conference
2014	Melbourne	Australia		Main Conference
2015	Amsterdam	Netherlands	Self-Regulation and Close Relationships	Mini-Conference
2015	New Brunswick, NJ	USA	Relationships, Health, and Wellness	Mini-Conference
2016	Toronto, ON	Canada		Main Conference
2017	Syracuse, NY	USA		Mini-Conference
2018	Fort Collins, CO	USA		Main Conference
2019	Ottawa, ON	Canada	Positive Action in Relationships	Mini-Conference and New Scholar Workshop
2019	Brighton, England	UK	Applied Relationship Science	Mini-Conference
2021	VIRTUAL			
2022	VIRTUAL			The European Association of Social Psychology (EASP) and the International Association for Relationship Research (IARR) joint symposium
2022	VIRTUAL			Main Conference
2023	Tempe, AZ	USA	Resilience in Interpersonal and Social Environments (RISE)	Mini-Conference
2023	Tuscaloosa, AL	USA	Dark Side of Relationships	Mini Conference
2024	Boston, MA	USA		Main Conference
2025	Uxbridge, England	UK	Gender, Sexuality, and Relationships	Mini-Conference
2026	Glasgow, Scotland	UK		Main Conference
