= Michael E. Sobel =

American statistician

- Born: Michael Edward Sobel
- Education: Florida State University; University of Wisconsin–Madison
- Known for: Sobel test
- Awards: Member of the Sociological Research Association
- Scientific career
- Fields: Statistics
- Institutions: Columbia University
- Thesis: Lifestyle and Social Structure in Contemporary American Society: Concepts, Definitions, and Analyses (1980)
- Doctoral advisor: Halliman H. Winsborough

Michael Edward Sobel is an American statistician who is a professor in the Department of Statistics at Columbia University. He is known for developing the Sobel test, a statistical test that is used to detect the presence of mediation between two variables by a third variable.
