= Reuben M. Baron =

American social psychologist (1936–2023)

- Born: August 1, 1936; Brooklyn, New York, US
- Died: June 25, 2023 (aged 86); New Jersey, US

Academic background
- Education: Brooklyn College; New York University
- Thesis: A cognitive model of attitude change (1963)
- Doctoral advisor: Stuart Cook
- Other advisor: Herbert C. Kelman

Academic work
- Institutions: Wayne State University; University of Connecticut

Reuben Maxwell Baron (August 1, 1936 – June 25, 2023) was an American social psychologist and professor emeritus at the University of Connecticut. He is best known for his highly cited 1986 paper with David A. Kenny distinguishing between mediator and moderator variables in social psychological research, and for his foundational contributions to ecological psychology, which sought to integrate James J. Gibson's ecological approach to perception with mainstream social psychology.

== Early life and education ==
Baron was born in Brooklyn, New York and raised in Crown Heights. He attended the Samuel J. Tilden High School, then Brooklyn College, where he majored in psychology, graduating in 1957. During his undergraduate years, he was strongly influenced by Harold Proshansky, who introduced him to social psychology through Solomon Asch's gestalt-oriented textbook and who later became one of the founders of environmental psychology. Baron went on to pursue doctoral studies at New York University, where he earned his Ph.D. in social psychology in 1963. There he worked with Stuart Cook, whose testimony had been influential in early U.S. Supreme Court decisions on school integration, reinforcing for Baron the idea that social psychology could have meaningful real-world impact. Following his doctorate, Baron accepted a two-year research associate position with Herbert C. Kelman at the Center for Conflict Resolution at the University of Michigan, where he also lectured in the Department of Psychology. There he collaborated with Kelman on studies of attitude-discrepant behavior.

== Work and career ==
In 1965, Baron was recruited to Wayne State University in Detroit, where he served as an assistant and then associate professor until 1972. During this period, he developed the concept of a social reinforcement standard — the idea that individuals are uncomfortable with reinforcement that deviates significantly from their personal history of reinforcement. He also applied these ideas to disadvantaged youth as part of broader social programs during the 1960s War on Poverty. It was during his time in Detroit that Baron developed a lasting passion for contemporary art, which would later intersect with his academic work in perception. Between 1970 and 1971, Baron took a sabbatical fellowship with Walter Mischel at Stanford University, where he immersed himself in the emerging field of cognitive social learning. There he was exposed to Bandura's work on observational modeling and Mischel's research on delay of gratification, deepening his interest in the cognitive dimensions of social behavior.

In 1972, Baron joined the University of Connecticut, where he was quickly promoted to full professor. This period marked the most transformative chapter of his career. Shortly after arriving, he began sitting in on graduate seminars led by Michael Turvey and Robert Shaw, through which he encountered James J. Gibson's theory of affordances and direct perception, as well as principles of dynamical systems theory. Inspired by Gibson's ecological framework, Baron began a sustained effort to bring ecological ideas into mainstream social psychology. His landmark 1983 paper with Leslie Z. McArthur, "Toward an Ecological Theory of Social Perception", published in Psychological Review, proposed that person perception could be accurate and stimulus-constrained, a direct challenge to the prevailing constructivist consensus. The paper introduced the concept of the event activity test, an interpersonal analogue to chemical solubility tests, in which carefully designed social situations reveal a person's true dispositions at a perceptual rather than a cognitive level. Beginning in the early 1990s, Baron extended his theorizing to incorporate dynamical systems theory, attending Turvey's seminars on coordination and subsequently teaching graduate seminars on complex systems in social psychology. His work in this vein reinterpreted classic findings — such as Sherif's norm formation studies — in terms of self-organization and emergent collective structures. Baron retired from University of Connecticut in 1998 and became professor emeritus.

After retirement, Baron moved to New Jersey and remained intellectually active in both psychology and the arts. Between 2001 and 2010, he produced several book chapters applying ecological and dynamical systems principles to group dynamics, intergroup conflict, and personality theory. These included analyses of the Israeli–Palestinian conflict using concepts such as tipping points, the Nash Equilibrium, and self-organizing systems, and a reconceptualization of personality traits in affordance terms. Baron has written art criticism for the online journal artcritical, in collaboration with his wife, Joan, drawing on his expertise in perception and affordances. Together they have also curated painting and photography exhibitions and co-chaired an endowed visual arts lecture series at their synagogue featuring figures such as architect Daniel Libeskind and artist-composer couple Beryl Korot and Steve Reich.

== Honors and awards ==
Baron is a fellow of the Society of Experimental Social Psychology (SESP). In 2008, he and David A. Kenny received the Scientific Impact Award from SESP for their joint work on the distinction between mediators and moderators, which is the article with the greatest scientific impact published in the society's history. Baron is also a fellow of the Association for Psychological Science.

== Books ==
- Baron, Reuben M.; Graziano, William G. (1991). Social Psychology. Harcourt College Publishers. ISBN 978-0-03-021524-7.
- Eagly, Alice Hendrickson; Baron, Reuben M.; Hamilton, V. Lee, eds. (2004). The Social Psychology of Group Identity and Social Conflict: Theory, Application, and Practice. American Psychological Association. ISBN 978-1-4338-0927-9.
