= David A. Kenny =

American social psychologist (born 1946)

- Born: David Anthony Kenny; November 10, 1946 (age 79)
- Education: University of California, Davis; Northwestern University
- Known for: Interpersonal perception, Dyadic data analysis, Mediation analysis
- Scientific career
- Workplaces: Harvard University; University of Connecticut
- Thesis: The measurement and explanation of population effects: Sex differences in mathematics and science in a longitudinal study (1972)
- Doctoral advisor: Donald T. Campbell
- Other academic advisors: Robert Sommer; Thomas D. Cook
- Website: davidakenny.net

David Anthony Kenny (born November 10, 1946) is an American social psychologist and applied statistician. He is currently Distinguished Professor Emeritus in the Department of Psychological Sciences at the University of Connecticut in Storrs, Connecticut. Among the subjects he has researched are the interpersonal perception, the statistical analysis of data from dyads and groups, as well as mediation analysis. He co-authored a 1986 paper with Reuben M. Baron on mediation analysis that has been highly influential in the years since, with 114,891 citations (Google Scholar, September 2022).

== Education and career ==
Kenny received his Bachelor of Arts degree in 1968 from the University of California, Davis, where his undergraduate mentor was the environmental psychologist Robert Sommer. He subsequently enrolled in the graduate program at Northwestern University, completing his Doctor of Philosophy in social psychology in 1972 under the supervision of Donald T. Campbell.

Following his doctoral work, Kenny joined the faculty of Harvard University in 1972, where he remained for six years. In 1978, he moved to the University of Connecticut and became an associate professor. Kenny remained there since and became the University Distinguished Professor in 2006, the highest professorial distinction conferred by the university.

== Honors and awards ==
Kenny is a member of the American Academy of Arts and Sciences. He was awarded the Donald T. Campbell Award from the Society of Personality and Social Psychology in 2006. He received the Award for Distinguished Scientific Contributions to Psychology from the American Psychological Association in 2019.

== Books ==
- Kenny, David A. (1979). Correlation and causality. New York: Wiley. ISBN 978-0-471-02439-2.
- Judd, Charles M.; Kenny, David A. (1981). Estimating the effects of social interventions. Cambridge; New York: Cambridge University Press. ISBN 978-0-521-22975-3.
- Kenny, David A. (1987). Statistics for the social and behavioral sciences. Boston: Little, Brown. ISBN 978-0-316-48915-7.
- Campbell, Donald T.; Kenny, David A. (1999). A primer on regression artifacts. Methodology in the social sciences. New York: Guilford Press. ISBN 978-1-57230-482-6.
- Kenny, David A.; Kashy, Deborah A.; Cook, William L. (2006). Dyadic data analysis. Methodology in the social sciences. New York: Guilford Press. ISBN 978-1-57230-986-9.
- Kenny, David A. (2020). Interpersonal perception: the foundation of social relationships (Second ed.). New York: The Guilford Press. ISBN 978-1-4625-4151-5.
