= Stuart W. Cook =

American social psychologist

- Born: April 17, 1913; Richmond, Virginia
- Died: March 25, 1993 (aged 79); Boulder, Colorado
- Education: University of Richmond; University of Minnesota
- Known for: Research on racial segregation
- Spouse: Annabelle Cook (m. 1938–1993)
- Children: 3
- Awards: 1986 Gold Medal Award from the American Psychological Association
- Scientific career
- Fields: Social psychology
- Institutions: New York University; University of Colorado
- Thesis: The Production of "experimental Neurosis" in the White Rat (1938)
- Doctoral students: Reuben M. Baron

Stuart Wellford Cook (April 17, 1913 — March 25, 1993) was an American social psychologist known for his research on the societal effects of racism and religious intolerance. He is particularly known for a study he conducted with Isidor Chein and Kenneth Bancroft Clark on the psychological effects of racial segregation. This study was cited by the appellates in the 1954 landmark United States Supreme Court case Brown v. Board of Education. His research also focused on many other psychological subjects, including clinical psychology, military psychology, and psychological research methods.

== Academic career ==
After receiving his Ph.D. in 1938, Cook served as a captain in the Army Air Force, working with John C. Flanagan on the aviation psychology program at Santa Ana Army Air Base. In 1949, he founded the Research Center for Human Relations at New York University, subsequently serving as the center's director. In 1950, he became head of the psychology department at New York University. He was the president of the Society for the Psychological Study of Social Issues from 1951 to 1952. In 1963, he became professor and chair of the psychology department at the University of Colorado. From 1978 to 1980, he was the head of the University of Colorado's Institute of Behavioral Science. He retired from the University of Colorado in 1980 as a Distinguished Professor.
