= Isidor Chein =

Isidor Chein (March 12, 1912 – April 18, 1981) was a noted psychologist. A native to New York City, Chein received a Bachelor of Science in social science from City College in 1932 and a masters and doctorate from Columbia University. Chein's research had social significance. He largely conducted research on three topics: attitude change in the context of inter-group relations, minority group identification, and opiate addiction in juveniles. He also wrote about the scientific foundations of psychology.

Chein served a member of, or consultant to, a number of research advisory committees. For example, Chein served on the American Psychology Associates’ Council of Representatives and Policy and Planning Board, the National Association of the Prevention of Addiction to Narcotics, and the National Jewish Welfare Board. In addition, Chein served as a research associate of New York City Mayor Fiorello La Guardia’s Committee on Unity. As a member of Mayor La Guardia's administration, Chein worked on social problems affecting New York City. Chein served as the director of research for the Commission on Community Interrelations of the American Jewish Congress, vice president of the Psychological Service Center of the New York Society of Clinical Psychologists, and president of the Society for the Psychological Study of Social Issues.

== Following World War II ==
After the end of World War II, Chein spent a decade studying attitude change. As the research director of the American Jewish Congress's Commission on Community Interrelations and as a New York University faculty member, Chein conducted research on inter-group prejudice. He helped shift the research emphasis in social psychology from prejudiced attitudes to prejudiced behavior. In addition, Chein contributed to the making of the Supreme Court's 1954 decision in Brown v. Board of Education. Chein, Stuart W. Cook, and Kenneth B. Clark co-wrote the amicus curiae brief (also known as "the social scientists' brief") for the purpose of acquainting the justices with the impact segregation had on the psychological functioning of African American children. The Court also cited two papers Chein wrote in its 7-0 decision to strike down school segregation.

== Early 1950s to Mid-1960s ==
Chein went on to conduct research on group identification. His work showed that children who were not conflicted over identifying with their own minority group tended to succeed in building relationships outside of their ethnic groups; by contrast, children who did not identify with their own minority group tended not to succeed in building those relationships.

Chein conducted research on the extent to which the objective environment can help researchers predict and understand an individual's behavior. Chein's conception of the objective environment included five features. The first involved the stimuli that led to the target individual to initiate a particular behavior. Chein called those stimuli the instigators of behavior. Behavioral instigators could range from handguns to invitations. The second feature was the presence or absence of objects that satisfy needs and goals. Such objects could include cars, books, and noise. The third involved features of the objective environment that provide support for or place constraints on behavior. Supports included any features of the environment that helped a behavior occur; constraints were obstacles that block or divert behavior. A support could be an object such as a car to enable one person to give another person a lift. A constraint could be missing information. The fourth was global features, i.e., the features that help predict a person's behavior, for example, the amount of neighborhood security (or insecurity). The fifth, and perhaps most important feature of the objective environment, was the presence of controls on behaviors. Controls could include the tendency to engage in violence or show compassion. Additionally, some controls or “directors,” as Chein called them, included social norms and attitudinal climate.

The work Chein conducted on the objective environment was not necessarily his most known work. His work on the objective environment, however, was important to his research efforts in the next area: the psychology of opiate addiction in juveniles. In the case of juveniles addicted to opiates, the objective environment could be used to help describe the passage into addiction (de Rivera, 1986). His research culminated in the book The Road to H. Chein advanced the view that the factors leading to and sustaining addiction were much more influential than the feeble rehabilitative countermeasures that society offered addicts. He believed that a total environment devoted to treating addiction, including sheltered employment, protected living quarters, and sometimes surrogate parents, was needed.

== Late 1960s to 1981 ==
During the late 1960s until 1981, Chein focused on a philosophy of science for psychology. He felt that it is harmful to the field that few psychologists failed think about psychology's philosophical foundations. Chein regarded the human being as "an active, responsible agent, not simply a helpless, powerless reagent." He discoursed on psychological constructs such as behavior, consciousness, the unconscious, etc. In 1972, Chein published The Science of Behavior and the Image of Man, as a way to understand psychology in terms of philosophy of science and to integrate psychology's application to society and its problems.

Chein received multiple awards until his passing in 1981. In 1967, Isidor Chein received the Psychologists of the Year Award from the New York Society of Clinical Psychologists. In 1974, Yeshiva University awarded Chein the honorary degree of Doctor of Humane Letters. The next year, the Society for the Psychological Study of Social Issues presented Chein with the Kurt Lewin Memorial Award. In 1976 the Alumni Federation of New York University awarded Chein the Great Teacher Award. Finally, in 1980, the American Psychological Association gave Chein the Award for Distinguished Contribution to Psychology in the Public Interest in 1980.
