= Suppressor variable =

A suppressor variable is a variable that increases the predictive validity of another variable when included in a regression equation.

Suppression can occur when a single causal variable is related to an outcome variable through two separate mediator variables, and when one of those mediated effects is positive and one is negative. In such a case, each mediator variable suppresses or conceals the effect that is carried through the other mediator variable. For example, higher intelligence scores (a causal variable, A) may cause an increase in error detection (a mediator variable, B) which in turn may cause a decrease in errors made at work on an assembly line (an outcome variable, X); at the same time, intelligence could also cause an increase in boredom (C), which in turn may cause an increase in errors (X). Thus, in one causal path intelligence decreases errors, and in the other it increases them. When neither mediator is included in the analysis, intelligence appears to have no effect or a weak effect on errors. However, when boredom is controlled intelligence will appear to decrease errors, and when error detection is controlled intelligence will appear to increase errors. If intelligence could be increased while only boredom was held constant, errors would decrease; if intelligence could be increased while holding only error detection constant, errors would increase.

== See also ==
- Confounding variable
