= Thomas D. Cook =

- Born: Thomas Dixon Cook; 31 July 1941 (age 84); Birkenhead, England, United Kingdom
- Citizenship: United Kingdom; United States
- Education: Oxford University; Stanford University
- Known for: Program evaluation Social science research methods
- Awards: Peter H. Rossi Award for Contributions to the Theory or Practice of Program Evaluation from the Association for Public Policy Analysis and Management (2012)
- Scientific career
- Fields: Sociology
- Institutions: Northwestern University; Mathematica Policy Research
- Thesis: Attitude change as a function of the interaction of reception and source competence (1967)

Thomas Dixon Cook (born 31 July 1941) is Professor Emeritus of Sociology at Northwestern University and Emeritus Fellow at their Institute for Policy Research, where he was formerly the Joan and Sarepta Harrison Chair of Ethics and Justice. In 2014, he became a senior fellow at Mathematica Policy Research.

== Honors and awards ==
Cook received the Myrdal Prize for Science from the American Evaluation Association in 1982 and the Donald Campbell Prize for Innovative Methodology from the Policy Sciences Organization in 1988. He was a fellow of the Center for Advanced Study in the Behavioral Sciences at Stanford University in 1997-1998. In 2000, he was elected as a fellow of the American Academy of Arts and Sciences, and he became a Margaret Mead Fellow of the American Academy of Political and Social Science in 2002. He received the Peter H. Rossi Award for Contributions to the Theory or Practice of Program Evaluation from the Association for Public Policy Analysis and Management in 2012.
