= Moderation (statistics) =

Statistics concept

In statistics and regression analysis, moderation (also known as effect modification) occurs when the relationship between two variables depends on a third variable. The third variable is referred to as the moderator variable (or effect modifier) or simply the moderator (or modifier). The effect of a moderating variable is characterized statistically as an interaction; that is, a categorical (e.g., sex, ethnicity, class) or continuous (e.g., age, level of reward) variable that is associated with the direction and/or magnitude of the relation between dependent and independent variables. Specifically within a correlational analysis framework, a moderator is a third variable that affects the zero-order correlation between two other variables, or the value of the slope of the dependent variable on the independent variable. In analysis of variance (ANOVA) terms, a basic moderator effect can be represented as an interaction between a focal independent variable and a factor that specifies the appropriate conditions for its operation.

== Example ==
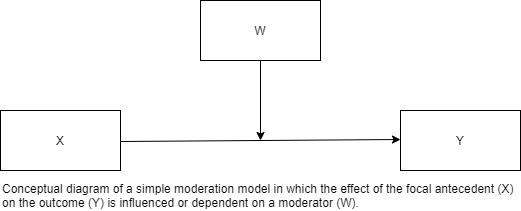
Conceptual diagram of a simple moderation model in which the effect of the focal antecedent (X) on the outcome (Y) is influenced or dependent on a moderator (W).

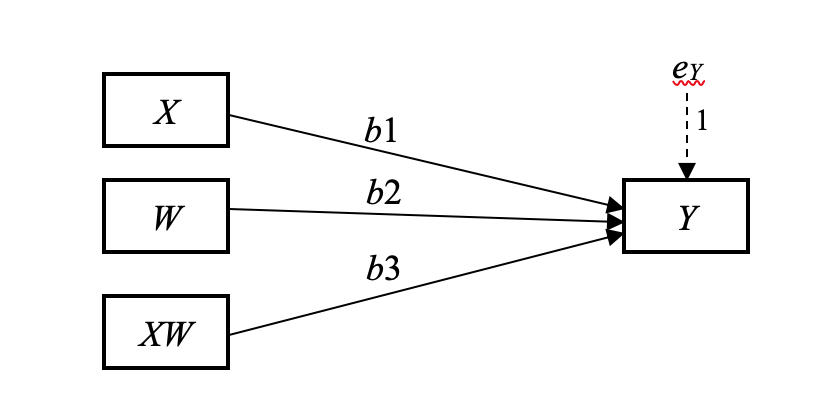
A statistical diagram of a simple moderation model.

Moderation analysis in the behavioral sciences involves the use of linear multiple regression analysis or causal modelling. To quantify the effect of a moderating variable in multiple regression analyses, regressing random variable Y on X, an additional term is added to the model. This term is the interaction between X and the proposed moderating variable.

Thus, for a response Y and two variables: x_{1} and moderating variable x_{2},:

$$Y = b_0 + b_1x_1 + b_2x_2 + b_3(x_1\times x_2) + \varepsilon \,$$

In this case, the role of x_{2} as a moderating variable is accomplished by evaluating b_{3}, the parameter estimate for the interaction term. See linear regression for discussion of statistical evaluation of parameter estimates in regression analyses.

For binary outcomes analyzed with logistic regression, however, the coefficient of an interaction term does not necessarily measure moderation on the probability scale. Because the logistic transformation is nonlinear, an interaction can be significant on the log-odds scale but not on the probability scale, or vice versa; probability-scale moderation can instead be evaluated using differences in marginal probabilities.

== Multicollinearity in moderated regression ==
In moderated regression analysis, a new interaction predictor ($x_1x_2$) is calculated. However, the new interaction term may be correlated with the two main effects terms used to calculate it. This is the problem of multicollinearity in moderated regression. Multicollinearity tends to cause coefficients to be estimated with higher standard errors and hence greater uncertainty.

Mean-centering (subtracting raw scores from the mean) may reduce multicollinearity, resulting in more interpretable regression coefficients. However, it does not affect the overall model fit.

== Post-hoc probing of interactions ==
Like simple main effect analysis in ANOVA, in post-hoc probing of interactions in regression, we are examining the simple slope of one independent variable at the specific values of the other independent variable. Below is an example of probing two-way interactions. In what follows, the regression equation with two variables A and B and an interaction term A*B,

$$Y = b_0 + b_1A + b_2B + b_3A*B + \varepsilon$$

will be considered.

=== Two categorical independent variables ===
If both of the independent variables are categorical variables, we can analyze the results of the regression for one independent variable at a specific level of the other independent variable. For example, suppose that both A and B are single dummy coded (0,1) variables, and that A represents ethnicity (0 = European Americans, 1 = East Asians) and B represents the condition in the study (0 = control, 1 = experimental). Then the interaction effect shows whether the effect of condition on the dependent variable Y is different for European Americans and East Asians and whether the effect of ethnic status is different for the two conditions. The coefficient of A shows the ethnicity effect on Y for the control condition, while the coefficient of B shows the effect of imposing the experimental condition for European American participants.

To probe if there is any significant difference between European Americans and East Asians in the experimental condition, we can simply run the analysis with the condition variable reverse-coded (0 = experimental, 1 = control), so that the coefficient for ethnicity represents the ethnicity effect on Y in the experimental condition. In a similar vein, if we want to see whether the treatment has an effect for East Asian participants, we can reverse code the ethnicity variable (0 = East Asians, 1 = European Americans).

=== One categorical and one continuous independent variable ===
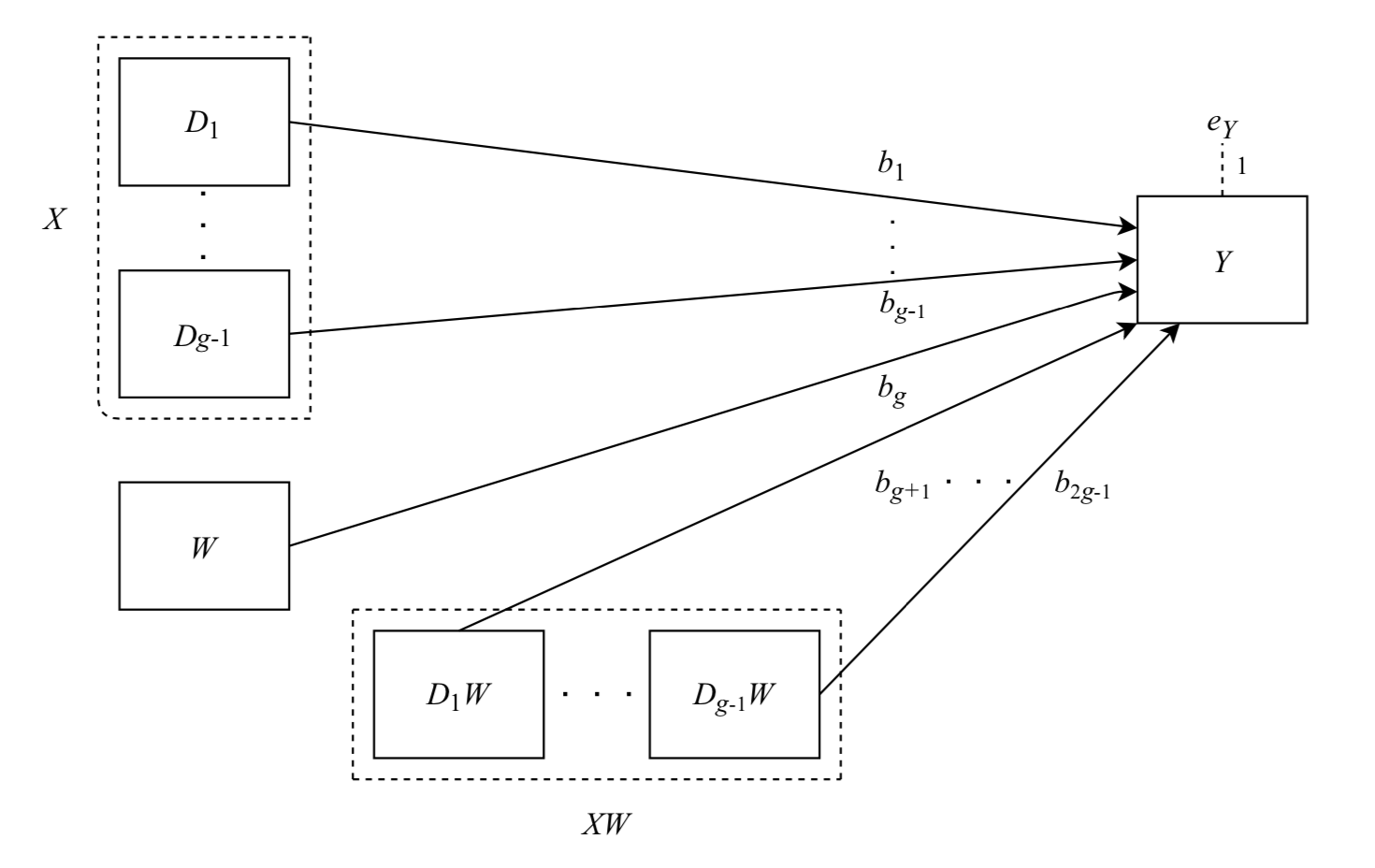
A statistical diagram that depicts a moderation model with X as a multicategorical independent variable.

If the first independent variable is a categorical variable (e.g. gender) and the second is a continuous variable (e.g. scores on the Satisfaction With Life Scale (SWLS)), then b_{1} represents the difference in the dependent variable between males and females when life satisfaction is zero. However, a zero score on the Satisfaction With Life Scale is meaningless as the range of the score is from 7 to 35. This is where centering comes in. If we subtract the mean of the SWLS score for the sample from each participant's score, the mean of the resulting centered SWLS score is zero. When the analysis is run again, b_{1} now represents the difference between males and females at the mean level of the SWLS score of the sample.

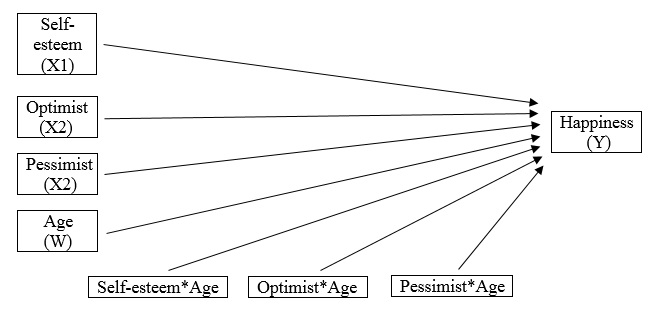
An example of conceptual moderation model with one categorical and one continuous independent variable.

Cohen et al. (2003) recommended using the following to probe the simple effect of gender on the dependent variable (Y) at three levels of the continuous independent variable: high (one standard deviation above the mean), moderate (at the mean), and low (one standard deviation below the mean). If the scores of the continuous variable are not standardized, one can just calculate these three values by adding or subtracting one standard deviation of the original scores; if the scores of the continuous variable are standardized, one can calculate the three values as follows: high = the standardized score minus 1, moderate (mean = 0), low = the standardized score plus 1. Then one can explore the effects of gender on the dependent variable (Y) at high, moderate, and low levels of the SWLS score. As with two categorical independent variables, b_{2} represents the effect of the SWLS score on the dependent variable for females. By reverse coding the gender variable, one can get the effect of the SWLS score on the dependent variable for males.

==== Coding in moderated regression ====
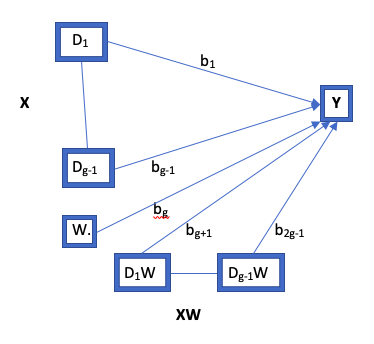

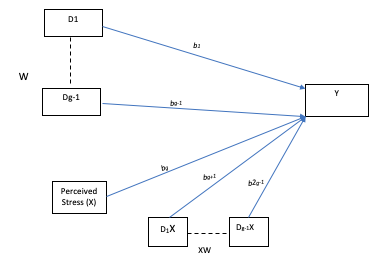
A statistical diagram that depicts a moderation model with W with three levels, as a multi-categorical independent variable.

When treating categorical variables such as ethnic groups and experimental treatments as independent variables in moderated regression, one needs to code the variables so that each code variable represents a specific setting of the categorical variable. There are three basic ways of coding: dummy-variable coding, contrast coding and effects coding. Below is an introduction to these coding systems.

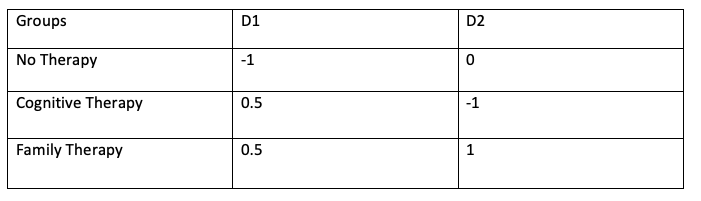
Effects coding

Dummy coding compares a reference group (one specific condition such as a control group in the experiment) with each of the other experimental groups. In this case, the intercept $b_0=\bar Y_\text{reference}$ is the mean of the reference group. Each unstandardized regression coefficient $b_A=\bar Y_A-\bar Y_\text{reference}$ is the difference in the dependent variable mean between a treatment group and the reference group. This coding system is similar to ANOVA analysis.

Contrast coding investigates a series of orthogonal contrasts (group comparisons). The intercept $b_0=\overline{\bar Y_{1\dots n}}$ is the unweighted mean of the individual group means. The unstandardized regression coefficient $b_{A,B}=\bar Y_B-\bar Y_A$ represents the difference between two groups. This coding system is appropriate when researchers have an a priori hypothesis concerning the specific differences among the group means.

Effects coding is used when there is no reference group or orthogonal contrasts. The intercept $b_0$ is the grand mean (the mean of all the conditions). The regression coefficient $b_A=\bar Y_A-\overline{\bar Y_{1\dots n}}$ is the difference between one group mean and the mean of all the group means. This coding system is appropriate when the groups represent natural categories.

=== Two continuous independent variables ===
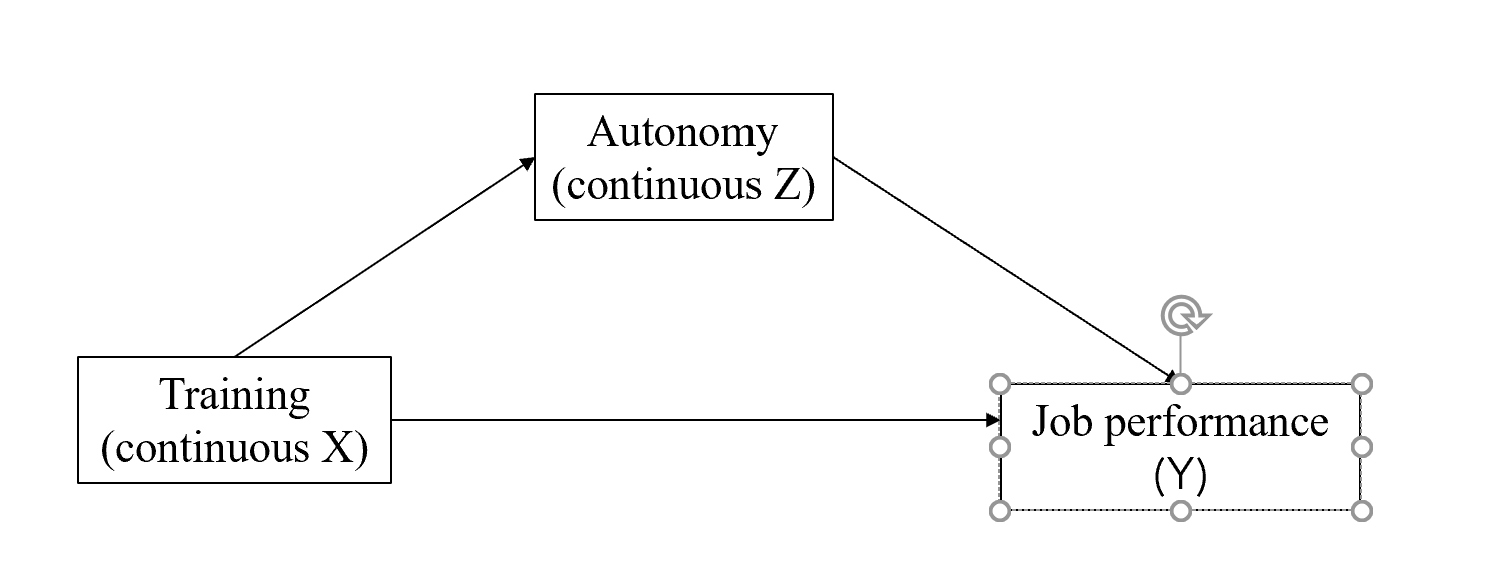

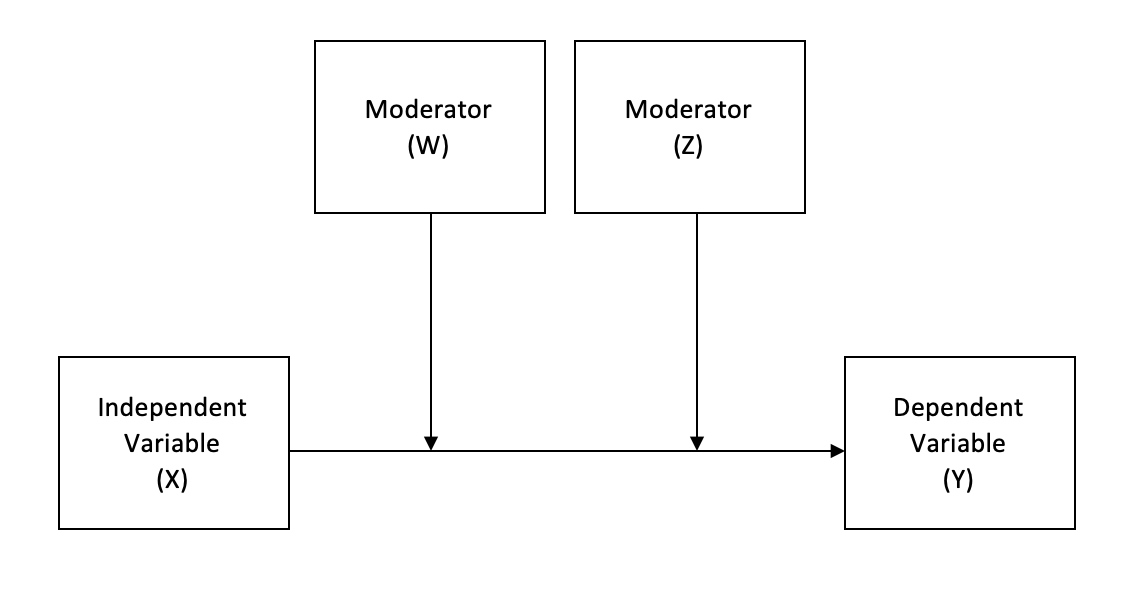
A conceptual diagram of an additive multiple moderation model

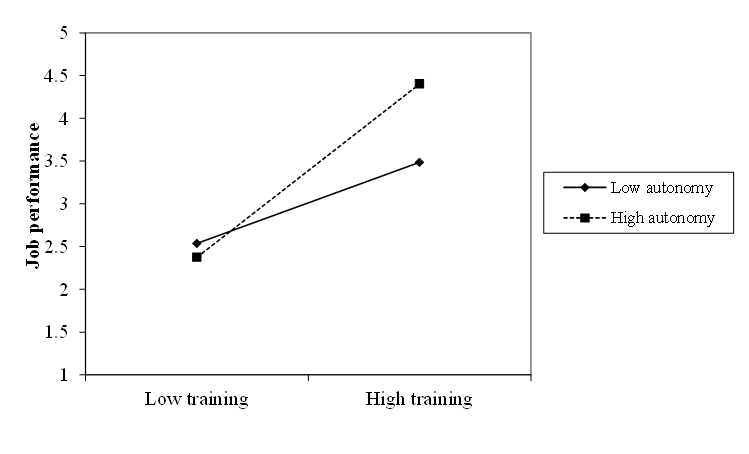
An example of a two-way interaction effect plot

If both of the independent variables are continuous, it is helpful for interpretation to either center or standardize the independent variables, X and Z. (Centering involves subtracting the overall sample mean score from the original score; standardizing does the same followed by dividing by the overall sample standard deviation.) By centering or standardizing the independent variables, the coefficient of X or Z can be interpreted as the effect of that variable on Y at the mean level of the other independent variable.

To probe the interaction effect, it is often helpful to plot the effect of X on Y at low and high values of Z (some people prefer to also plot the effect at moderate values of Z, but this is not necessary). Often values of Z that are one standard deviation above and below the mean are chosen for this, but any sensible values can be used (and in some cases there are more meaningful values to choose). The plot is usually drawn by evaluating the values of Y for high and low values of both X and Z, and creating two lines to represent the effect of X on Y at the two values of Z. Sometimes this is supplemented by simple slope analysis, which determines whether the effect of X on Y is statistically significant at particular values of Z. A common technique for simple slope analysis is the Johnson-Neyman approach. Various internet-based tools exist to help researchers plot and interpret such two-way interactions.

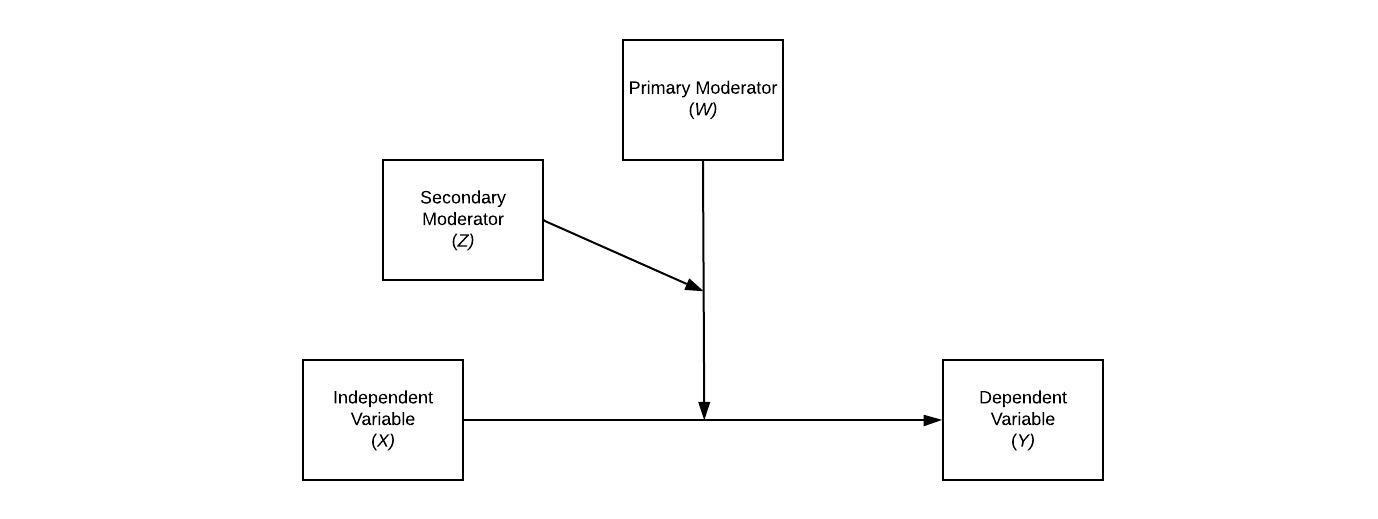
A conceptual diagram of a moderated moderation model, otherwise known as a three-way interaction.

=== Higher-level interactions ===
The principles for two-way interactions apply when we want to explore three-way or higher-level interactions. For instance, if we have a three-way interaction between A, B, and C, the regression equation will be as follows:

$$Y = b_0 + b_1A + b_2B + b_3C + b_4A\cdot B + b_5A\cdot C + b_6B\cdot C + b_7A\cdot B\cdot C + \varepsilon.$$

=== Spurious higher-order effects ===
It is worth noting that the reliability of the higher-order terms depends on the reliability of the lower-order terms. For example, if the reliability for variable A is 0.70, the reliability for variable B is 0.80, and their correlation is r = 0.2, then the reliability for the interaction variable A * B is $((0.7 \times 0.8) + 0.2^2)/(1+0.2^2) = 0.577$. In this case, low reliability of the interaction term leads to low power; therefore, we may not be able to find the interaction effects between A and B that actually exist. The solution for this problem is to use highly reliable measures for each independent variable.

Another caveat for interpreting the interaction effects is that when variable A and variable B are highly correlated, then the A * B term will be highly correlated with the omitted variable A^{2}; consequently what appears to be a significant moderation effect might actually be a significant nonlinear effect of A alone. If this is the case, it is worth testing a nonlinear regression model by adding nonlinear terms in individual variables into the moderated regression analysis to see if the interactions remain significant. If the interaction effect A*B is still significant, we will be more confident in saying that there is indeed a moderation effect; however, if the interaction effect is no longer significant after adding the nonlinear term, we will be less certain about the existence of a moderation effect and the nonlinear model will be preferred because it is more parsimonious.

Moderated regression analyses also tend to include additional variables, which are conceptualized as covariates of no interest. However, the presence of these covariates can induce spurious effects when either (1) the covariate (C) is correlated with one of the primary variables of interest (e.g. variable A or B), or (2) when the covariate itself is a moderator of the correlation between either A or B with Y. The solution is to include additional interaction terms in the model, for the interaction between each confounder and the primary variables as follows:

$$Y = b_0 + b_1A + b_2B + b_3C + b_4A\cdot B + b_5A\cdot C +  b_6B\cdot C + \varepsilon$$

== See also ==
- Omitted-variable bias
