= Human behavior =

Array of every physical action and observable emotion associated with humans

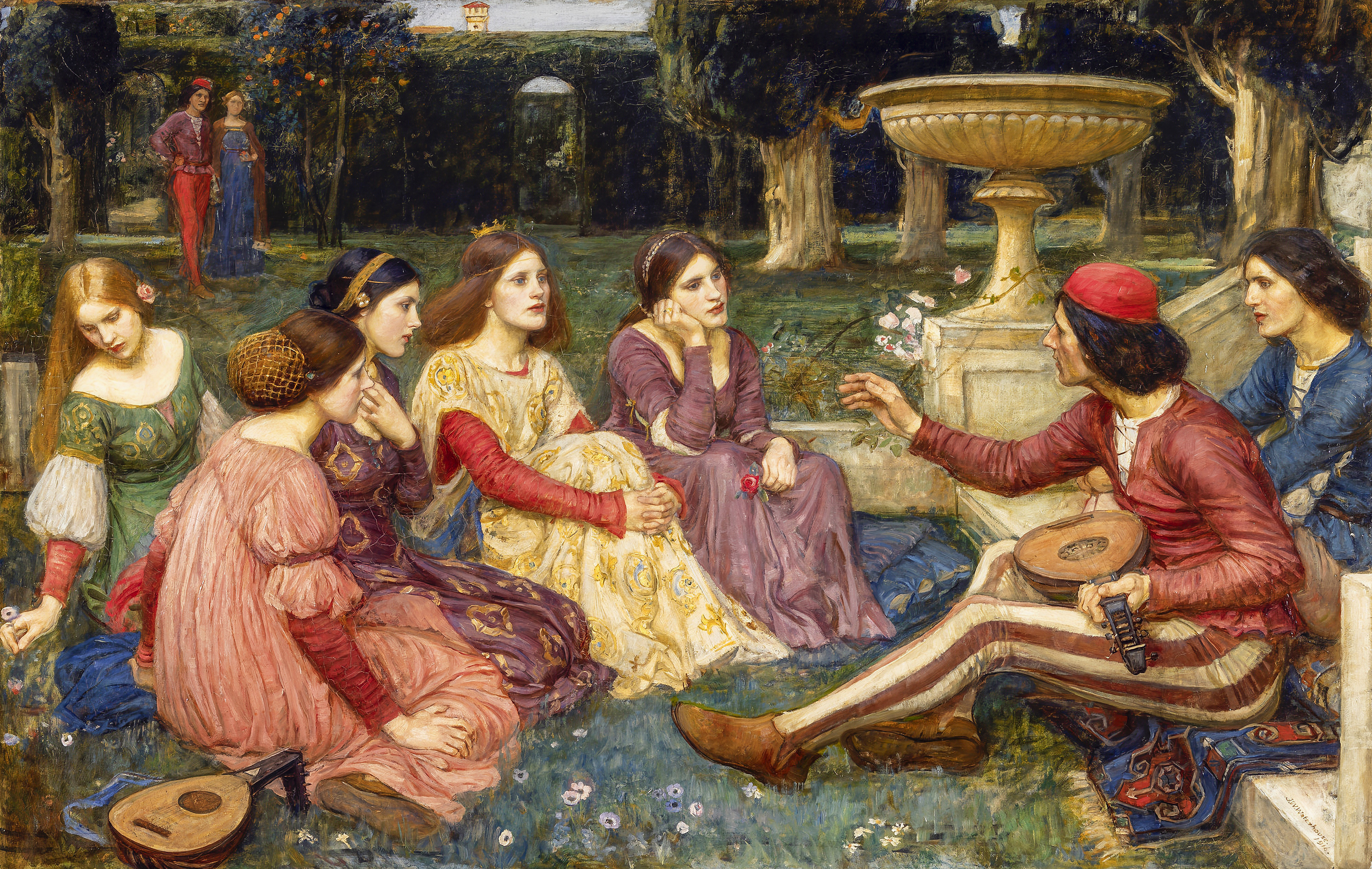
Social interaction and creative expression are forms of human behavior

Human behavior is the potential and expressed capacity (mentally, physically, and socially) of human individuals or groups to respond to internal and external stimuli throughout their life. Behavior is driven by environmental and genetic factors that affect an individual. Behavior is also driven, in part, by thoughts and feelings, which provide insight into individual psyche, revealing such things as attitudes and values. Human behavior is shaped by psychological traits, as personality types vary from person to person, producing different actions and behavior.

Human behavior encompasses a vast array of domains that span the entirety of human experience. Social behavior involves interactions between individuals and groups, while cultural behavior reflects the diverse patterns, values, and practices that vary across societies and historical periods. Moral behavior encompasses ethical decision-making and value-based conduct, contrasted with antisocial behavior that violates social norms and legal standards. Cognitive behavior involves mental processes of learning, memory, and decision-making, interconnected with psychological behavior that includes emotional regulation, mental health, and individual differences in personality and temperament.

Developmental behavior changes across the human lifespan from infancy through aging, while organizational behavior governs conduct in workplace and institutional settings. Consumer behavior drives economic choices and market interactions, and political behavior shapes civic engagement, voting patterns, and governance participation. Religious behavior and spiritual practices reflect humanity's search for meaning and transcendence, while gender and sexual behavior encompass identity expression and intimate relationships. Collective behavior emerges in groups, crowds, and social movements, often differing significantly from individual conduct.

Contemporary human behavior increasingly involves digital and technological interactions that reshape communication, learning, and social relationships. Environmental behavior reflects how humans interact with natural ecosystems and respond to climate change, while health behavior encompasses choices affecting physical and mental well-being. Creative behavior drives artistic expression, innovation, and cultural production, and educational behavior governs learning processes across formal and informal settings.

Social behavior accounts for actions directed at others. It is concerned with the considerable influence of social interaction and culture, as well as ethics, interpersonal relationships, politics, and conflict. Some behaviors are common while others are unusual. The acceptability of behavior depends upon social norms and is regulated by various means of social control. Social norms also condition behavior, whereby humans are pressured into following certain rules and displaying certain behaviors that are deemed acceptable or unacceptable depending on the given society or culture.

Cognitive behavior accounts for actions of obtaining and using knowledge. It is concerned with how information is learned and passed on, as well as creative application of knowledge and personal beliefs such as religion. Physiological behavior accounts for actions to maintain the body. It is concerned with basic bodily functions as well as measures taken to maintain health. Economic behavior accounts for actions regarding the development, organization, and use of materials as well as other forms of work. Ecological behavior accounts for actions involving the ecosystem. It is concerned with how humans interact with other organisms and how the environment shapes human behavior.

The study of human behavior is inherently interdisciplinary, drawing from psychology, sociology, anthropology, neuroscience, economics, political science, criminology, public health, and emerging fields like cyberpsychology and environmental psychology. The nature versus nurture debate remains central to understanding human behavior, examining the relative contributions of genetic predispositions and environmental influences. Contemporary research increasingly recognizes the complex interactions between biological, psychological, social, cultural, and environmental factors that shape behavioral outcomes, with practical applications spanning clinical psychology, public policy, education, marketing, criminal justice, and technology design.

== Study ==
Human behavior is studied by the social sciences, which include psychology, sociology, gender studies, ethology, and their various branches and schools of thought. There are many different facets of human behavior, and no one definition or field study encompasses it in its entirety. The nature versus nurture debate is one of the fundamental divisions in the study of human behavior; this debate considers whether behavior is predominantly affected by genetic or environmental factors. The study of human behavior sometimes receives public attention due to its intersection with cultural issues, including crime, sexuality, and social inequality.

Some natural sciences also place emphasis on human behavior. Neurology and evolutionary biology, study how behavior is controlled by the nervous system and how the human mind evolved, respectively. In other fields, human behavior may be a secondary subject of study when considering how it affects another subject. Outside of formal scientific inquiry, human behavior and the human condition is also a major focus of philosophy and literature. Philosophy of mind considers aspects such as free will, the mind–body problem, and malleability of human behavior.

Human behavior may be evaluated through questionnaires, interviews, and experimental methods. Animal testing may also be used to test behaviors that can then be compared to human behavior. Twin studies are a common method by which human behavior is studied. Twins with identical genomes can be compared to isolate genetic and environmental factors in behavior. Lifestyle, susceptibility to disease, and unhealthy behaviors have been identified to have both genetic and environmental indicators through twin studies.

== Social behavior ==
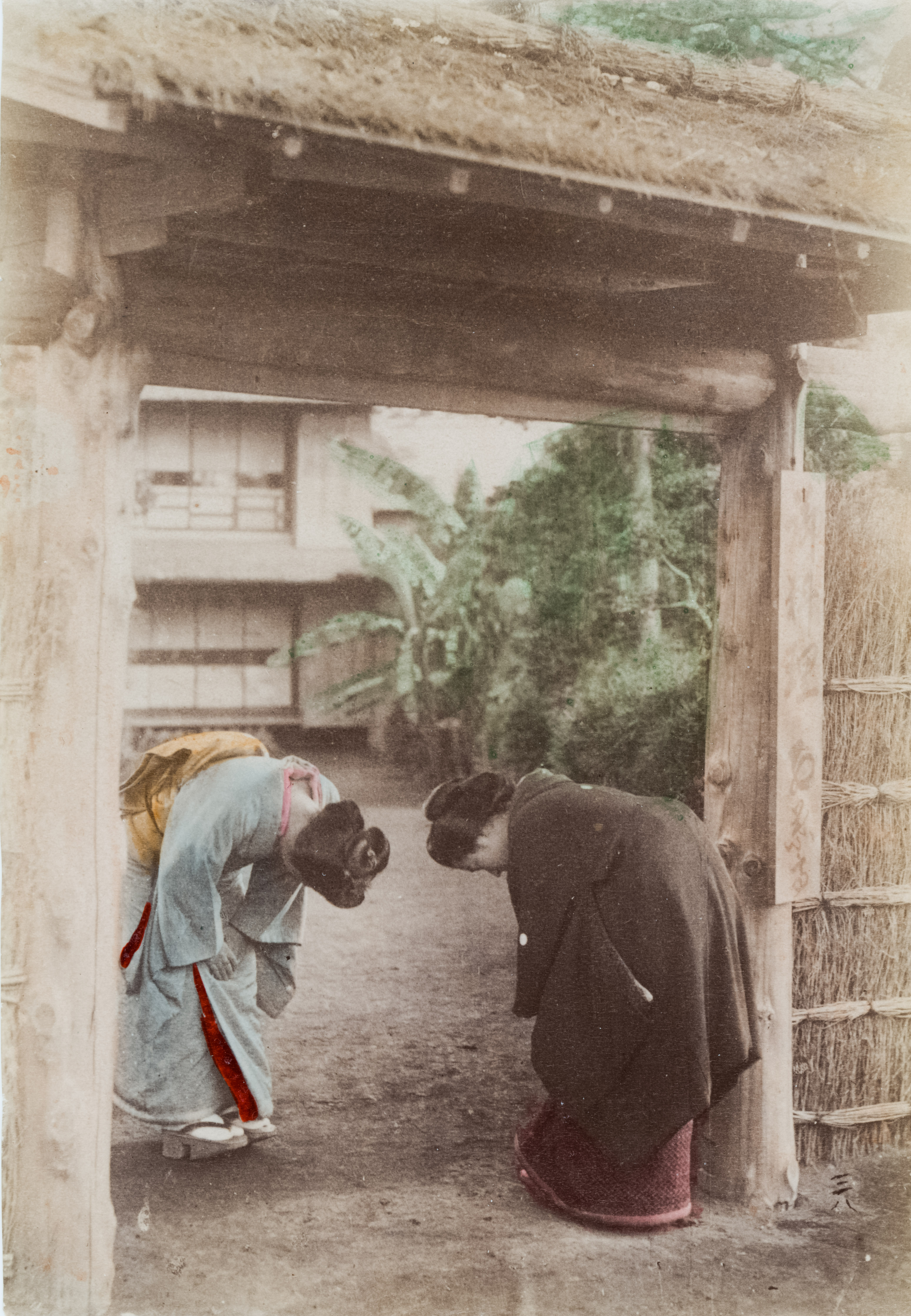
Women bowing in Japan (c. 1880)

Human social behavior is the behavior that considers other humans, including communication and cooperation. It is highly complex and structured, based on advanced theory of mind that allows humans to attribute thoughts and actions to one another. Through social behavior, humans have developed society and culture distinct from other animals. Human social behavior is governed by a combination of biological factors that affect all humans and cultural factors that change depending on upbringing and societal norms. Human communication is based heavily on language, typically through speech or writing. Nonverbal communication and paralanguage can modify the meaning of communications by demonstrating ideas and intent through physical and vocal behaviors.

=== Social norms ===
Human behavior in a society is governed by social norms. Social norms are unwritten expectations that members of society have for one another. These norms are ingrained in the particular culture that they emerge from, and humans often follow them unconsciously or without deliberation. These norms affect every aspect of life in human society, including decorum, social responsibility, property rights, contractual agreement, morality, and justice. Many norms facilitate coordination between members of society and prove mutually beneficial, such as norms regarding communication and agreements. Norms are enforced by social pressure, and individuals that violate social norms risk social exclusion.

Systems of ethics are used to guide human behavior to determine what is moral. Humans are distinct from other animals in the use of ethical systems to determine behavior. Ethical behavior is human behavior that takes into consideration how actions will affect others and whether behaviors will be optimal for others. What constitutes ethical behavior is determined by the individual value judgments of the person and the collective social norms regarding right and wrong. Value judgments are intrinsic to people of all cultures, though the specific systems used to evaluate them may vary. These systems may be derived from divine law, natural law, civil authority, reason, or a combination of these and other principles. Altruism is an associated behavior in which humans consider the welfare of others equally or preferentially to their own. While other animals engage in biological altruism, ethical altruism is unique to humans.

Deviance is behavior that violates social norms. As social norms vary between individuals and cultures, the nature and severity of a deviant act is subjective. What is considered deviant by a society may also change over time as new social norms are developed. Deviance is punished by other individuals through social stigma, censure, or violence. Many deviant actions are recognized as crimes and punished through a system of criminal justice. Deviant actions may be punished to prevent harm to others, to maintain a particular worldview and way of life, or to enforce principles of morality and decency. Cultures also attribute positive or negative value to certain physical traits, causing individuals that do not have desirable traits to be seen as deviant.

=== Interpersonal relationships ===
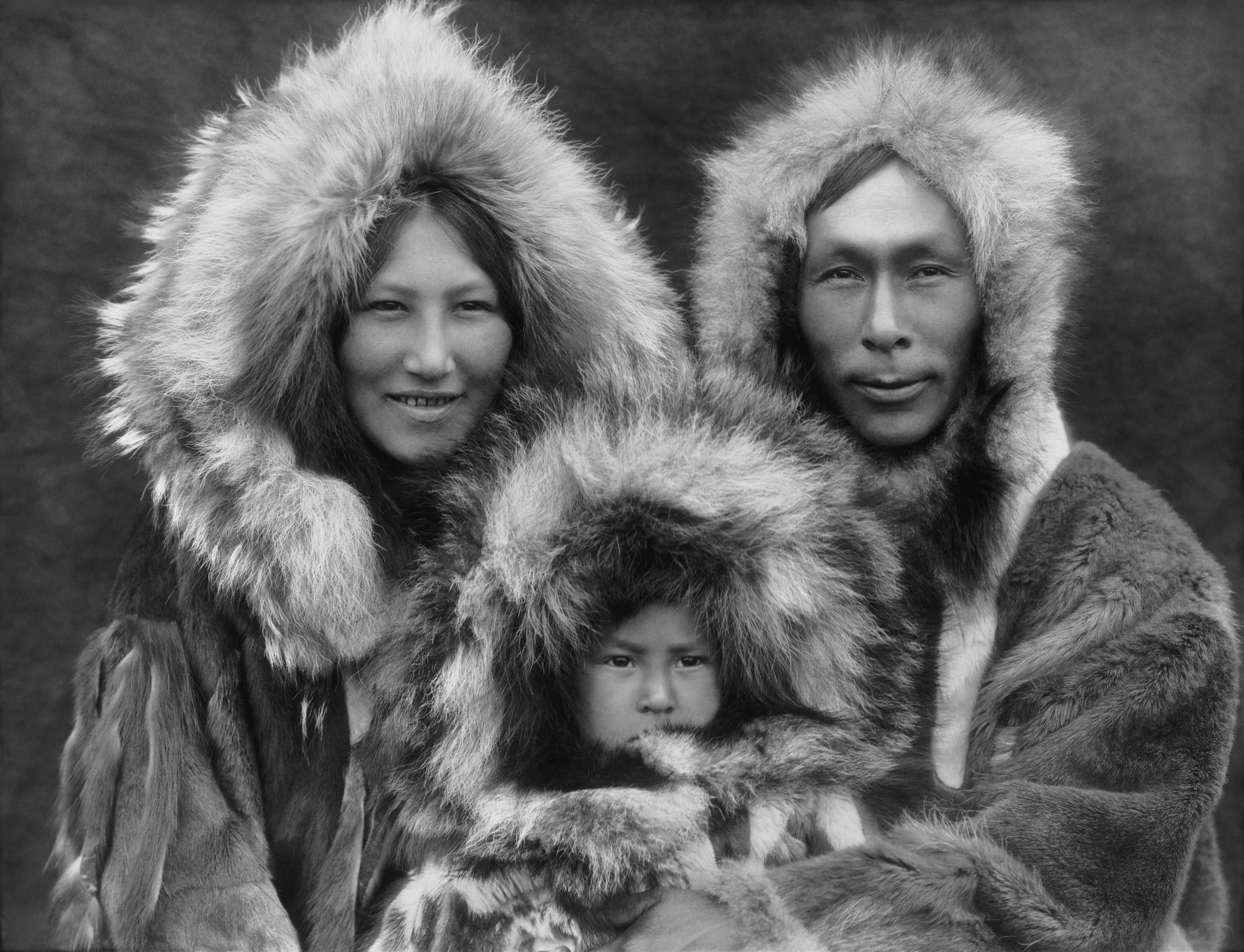
A family in Noatak, Alaska (1929)

Interpersonal relationships can be evaluated by the specific choices and emotions between two individuals, or they can be evaluated by the broader societal context of how such a relationship is expected to function. Relationships are developed through communication, which creates intimacy, expresses emotions, and develops identity. An individual's interpersonal relationships form a social group in which individuals all communicate and socialize with one another, and these social groups are connected by additional relationships. Human social behavior is affected not only by individual relationships, but also by how behaviors in one relationship may affect others. Individuals that actively seek out social interactions are extraverts, and those that do not are introverts.

Romantic love is a significant interpersonal attraction toward another. Its nature varies by culture, but it is often contingent on gender, occurring in conjunction with sexual attraction, sexual orientation and romantic orientation. It takes different forms and is associated with many individual emotions. Many cultures place a higher emphasis on romantic love than other forms of interpersonal attraction. Marriage is a union between two people, though whether it is associated with romantic love is dependent on the culture. Individuals that are closely related by consanguinity form a family. There are many variations on family structures that may include parents and children as well as stepchildren or extended relatives. Family units with children emphasize parenting, in which parents engage in a high level of parental investment to protect and instruct children as they develop over a period of time longer than that of most other mammals.

=== Politics and conflict ===
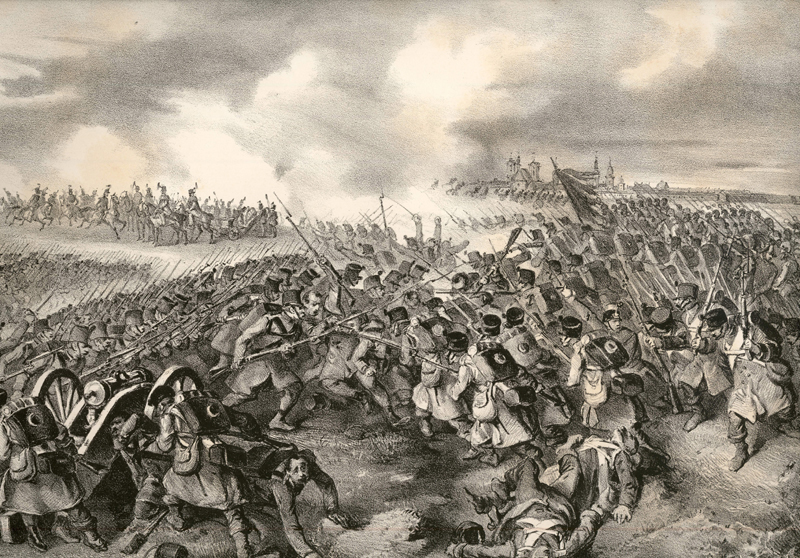
A depiction of men fighting in the First Battle of Komárom (1849)

When humans make decisions as a group, they engage in politics. Humans have evolved to engage in behaviors of self-interest, but this also includes behaviors that facilitate cooperation rather than conflict in collective settings. Individuals will often form in-group and out-group perceptions, through which individuals cooperate with the in-group and compete with the out-group. This causes behaviors such as unconsciously conforming, passively obeying authority, taking pleasure in the misfortune of opponents, initiating hostility toward out-group members, artificially creating out-groups when none exist, and punishing those that do not comply with the standards of the in-group. These behaviors lead to the creation of political systems that enforce in-group standards and norms.

When humans oppose one another, it creates conflict. It may occur when the involved parties have a disagreement of opinion, when one party obstructs the goals of another, or when parties experience negative emotions such as anger toward one another. Conflicts purely of disagreement are often resolved through communication or negotiation, but incorporation of emotional or obstructive aspects can escalate conflict. Interpersonal conflict is that between specific individuals or groups of individuals. Social conflict is that between different social groups or demographics. This form of conflict often takes place when groups in society are marginalized, do not have the resources they desire, wish to instigate social change, or wish to resist social change. Significant social conflict can cause civil disorder. International conflict is that between nations or governments. It may be solved through diplomacy or war.

== Cultural and cross-cultural behavior ==
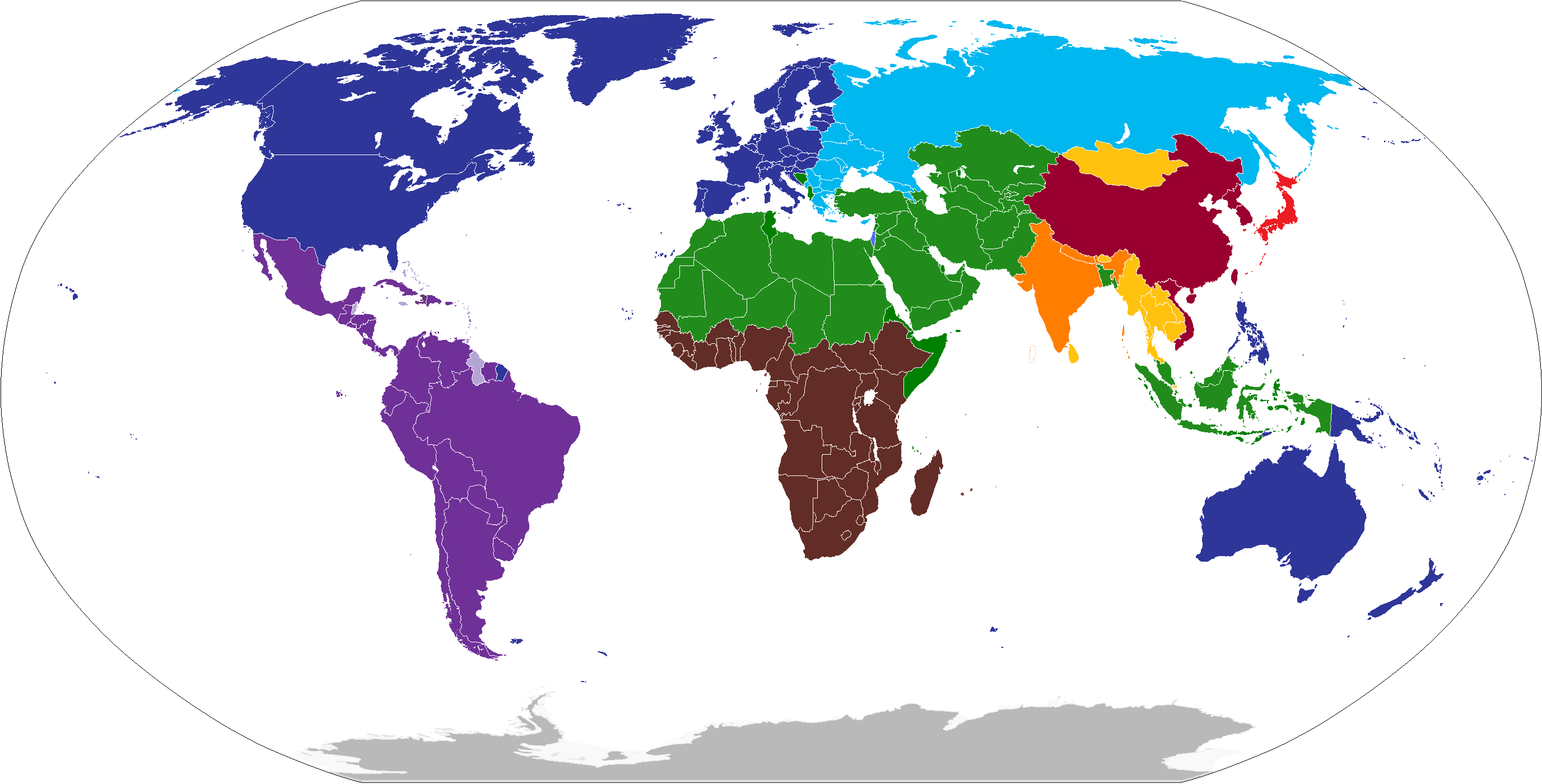
World map showing major cultural civilizations according to Samuel P. Huntington's "Clash of Civilizations" theory, illustrating how cultural boundaries influence human behavior patterns across different regions of the world Western World (Western Christendom) Orthodox Civilization (Orthodox Christendom) Islamic World (Ummah) Sinosphere (Sinic World) Latin America Sub-Saharan Africa Hindu Civilization (Hindudom) Buddhist Civilization Anglophone Caribbean Israel Japan

Cultural and cross-cultural behavior represents one of the most fundamental aspects of human psychology, encompassing the complex ways in which cultural contexts shape cognition, emotion, social interaction, and behavioral expression across diverse human populations. This field examines both universal patterns of human behavior that transcend cultural boundaries and the variations in psychological processes that emerge from different cultural environments and historical experiences.

Cultural behavior developed through human migration and adaptation across diverse environments, beginning approximately 70,000-100,000 years ago when early modern humans began their journey out of Africa. This process enabled cultural evolution at rates far exceeding genetic adaptation, allowing humans to colonize virtually every terrestrial environment through sophisticated mechanisms of cultural transmission. Notable examples include the colonization of Australia 50,000 years ago and the Polynesian expansion across the Pacific Ocean, which required advanced navigation technologies and cultural knowledge systems.

Contemporary research reveals significant cultural influences on fundamental psychological processes. The distinction between individualistic and collectivistic cultural orientations profoundly affects cognition, with individualistic cultures promoting analytic thinking styles while collectivistic cultures foster holistic thinking patterns. These differences extend to self-concept, emotional expression, moral reasoning, and social interaction patterns.

Cross-cultural psychology faces methodological challenges related to the overrepresentation of WEIRD (Western, Educated, Industrialized, Rich, and Democratic) populations, which represent less than 12% of the world's population but account for over 95% of psychological research samples. Contemporary efforts emphasize collaborative research practices and recognition of diverse epistemologies and Indigenous knowledge systems.

Cultural adaptation and acculturation represent critical processes through which individuals navigate cultural change and contact. When encountering new cultural environments through migration or cultural contact, individuals engage in behavioral, cognitive, and identity changes that vary from assimilation to integration strategies. The success of cultural adaptation depends on factors including cultural distance, social support, language proficiency, and individual characteristics.

== Developmental behavior ==
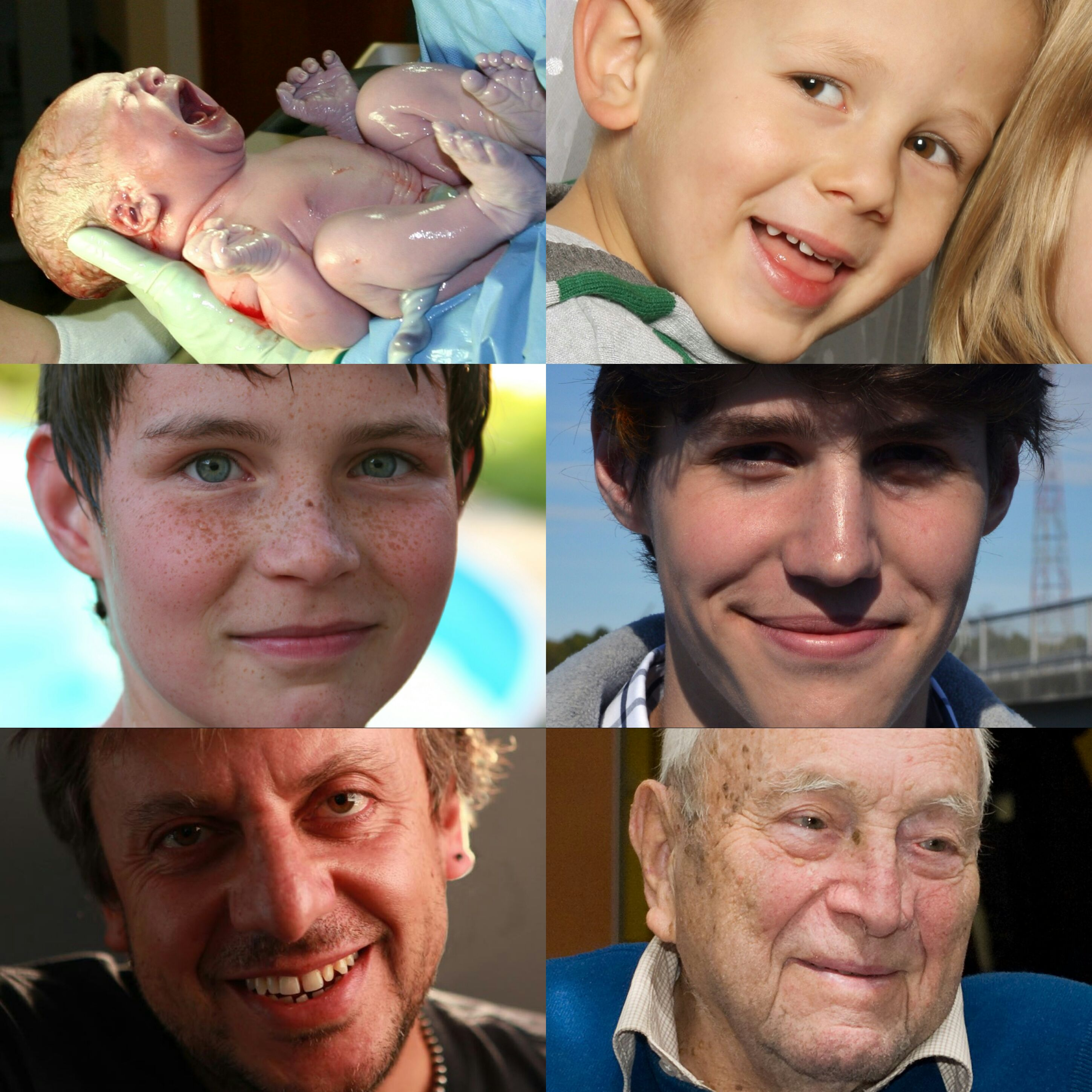
An image collage illustrating the stages of human development from infancy through late adulthood, showing the progression of physical, cognitive, and psychosocial changes across the lifespan

Developmental behavior encompasses the systematic changes in human behavior patterns that occur across the entire lifespan, from conception through death. These behavioral transformations reflect the complex interplay between biological maturation, environmental influences, and individual experiences that shape how humans think, feel, and act at different life stages.

Infancy and early childhood represent periods of rapid behavioral development, characterized by the emergence of fundamental capacities for social interaction, emotional regulation, and cognitive processing. Attachment theory provides a crucial framework for understanding early developmental behavior, demonstrating how infants' behavioral patterns with primary caregivers establish internal working models that influence social and emotional behavior throughout life. The emergence of theory of mind around age 4-5 represents a critical milestone, enabling children to understand that others have different beliefs and intentions.

Adolescence brings dramatic changes in developmental behavior, driven by brain reorganization particularly in the prefrontal cortex, which affects behavioral regulation and decision-making. Identity formation represents a central developmental task, involving exploration and commitment to various roles, values, and beliefs. Contemporary research reveals that adolescent mental health challenges affect approximately one in seven adolescents globally, significantly impacting behavioral development during this critical period.

Adult developmental behavior is characterized by increasing complexity as adults navigate multiple roles and responsibilities. Young adulthood involves establishing intimate relationships and career development, while middle adulthood focuses on generativity and family responsibilities. Research on adult neuroplasticity demonstrates that the brain remains capable of significant change throughout life, supporting continued behavioral growth and adaptation.

Late-life developmental behavior encompasses complex patterns of adaptation and change that characterize aging processes. The concept of successful aging emphasizes behavioral patterns that promote continued engagement and life satisfaction. Research on socioemotional selectivity theory suggests that older adults become increasingly selective in their social relationships, prioritizing emotionally meaningful connections as an adaptive strategy for maximizing well-being.

Understanding developmental behavior requires integration of multiple theoretical frameworks. Jean Piaget's theory of cognitive development describes how thinking patterns evolve through distinct stages, while Erik Erikson's theory of psychosocial development provides a framework for understanding social and emotional behavioral patterns across eight lifespan stages. Bronfenbrenner's ecological systems theory emphasizes how multiple environmental contexts influence developmental behavior through nested systems of influence from family to cultural values.

== Moral behavior ==
The trolley problem is a classic thought experiment in moral philosophy used to study ethical decision-making processes

Moral behavior encompasses actions and decisions guided by principles of right and wrong, reflecting an individual's ethical framework and value system. Humans are distinguished from other animals by their capacity for complex moral reasoning and the development of sophisticated ethical systems that govern behavior within societies. Research demonstrates that moral behavior involves complex interactions between emotional intuitions and rational deliberation, with specific brain regions dedicated to processing moral information and generating ethical judgments.

Moral development begins in early childhood and continues throughout life, involving the gradual acquisition of moral principles and their application in complex situations. Lawrence Kohlberg's theory of the stages of moral development identifies six stages progressing from simple obedience to authority in childhood to abstract principles of justice and human rights in adulthood. Children demonstrate early moral intuitions, showing preferences for fairness and helping behavior as young as 15 months old.

Neuroimaging research has identified specific brain regions involved in moral behavior, particularly the ventromedial prefrontal cortex (VMPFC), which plays a central role in moral decision-making and emotional responses to moral dilemmas. The VMPFC integrates emotional and cognitive information to generate moral judgments, working alongside regions that process empathy, theory of mind, and social emotions such as guilt, shame, and moral outrage.

Cross-cultural studies reveal both universal moral concerns, such as harm prevention and fairness, and culturally specific moral values. Moral foundations theory identifies six fundamental moral concerns that vary in importance across cultures: care/harm, fairness/cheating, loyalty/betrayal, authority/subversion, sanctity/degradation, and liberty/oppression. Individual differences in moral behavior are influenced by personality traits, moral identity, and group contexts, with phenomena such as the bystander effect demonstrating how social situations can affect ethical decision-making.

== Antisocial and criminal behavior ==
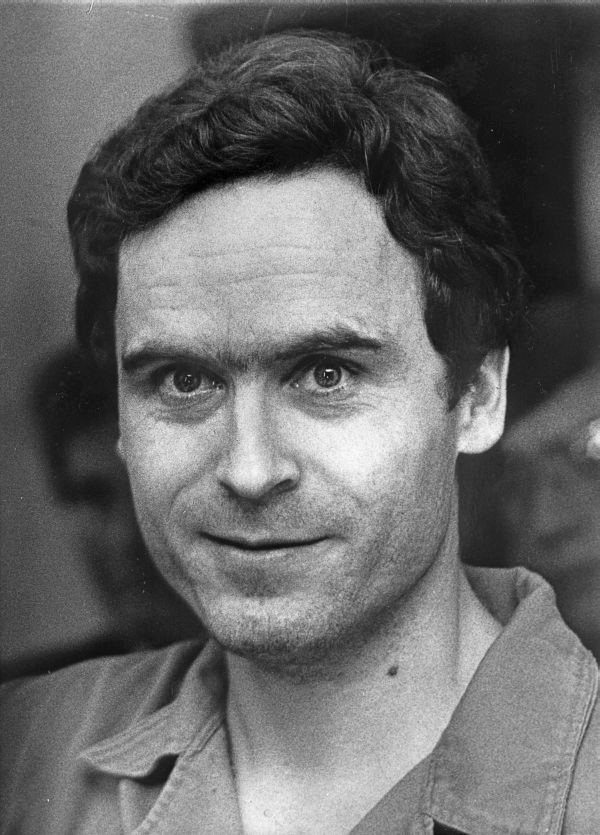
Ted Bundy, a notorious serial killer who exemplified antisocial personality disorder and psychopathic traits

Antisocial and criminal behavior encompasses actions that violate societal norms, laws, and the rights of others. This behavioral domain includes deceptive practices, violent crimes, sexual offenses, property crimes, organized criminal enterprises, and extremist ideologies. Such behaviors exist across all cultures and societies, though their specific manifestations and societal responses vary considerably. Research demonstrates that antisocial behavior involves complex interactions between genetic predispositions, environmental factors, and neurobiological abnormalities that affect impulse control and moral reasoning.

=== Deceptive and fraudulent behavior ===
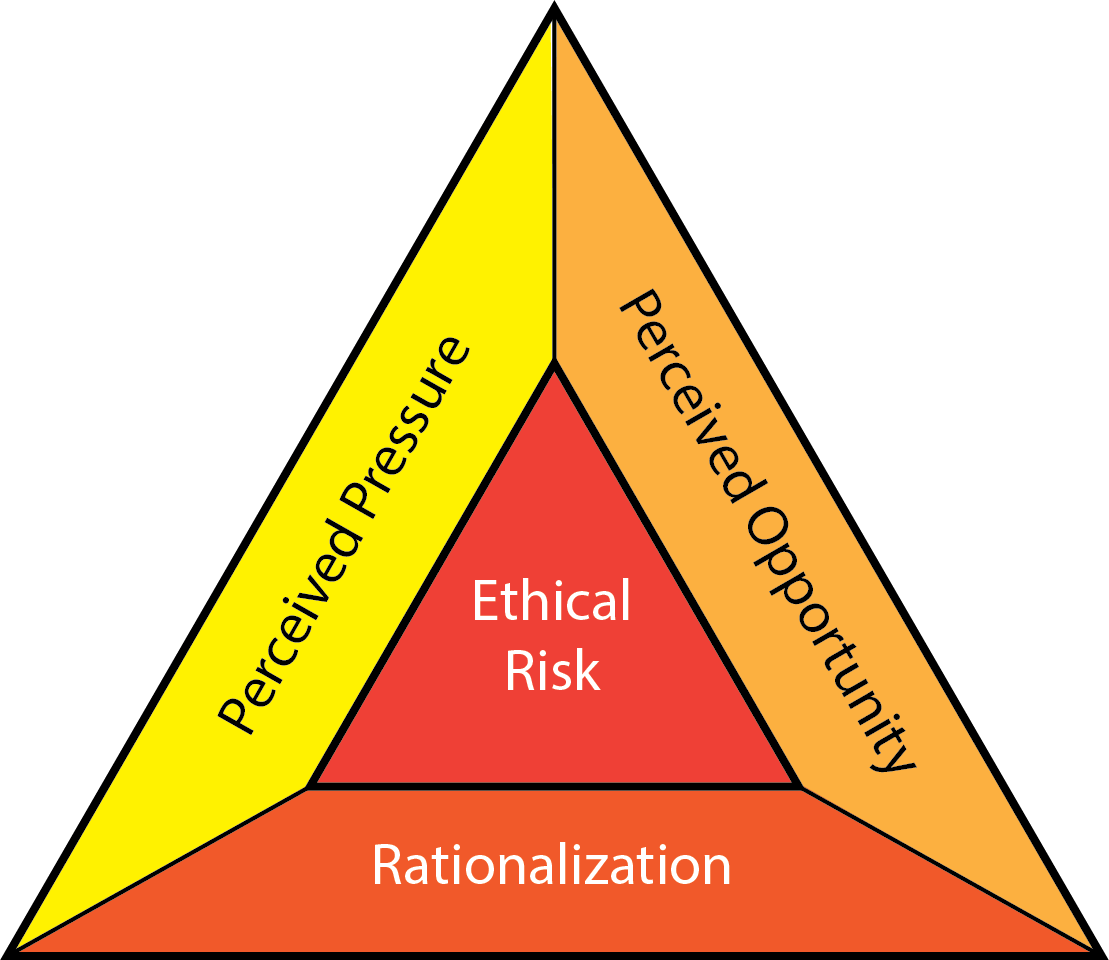
The fraud triangle showing the three conditions that enable fraudulent behavior: opportunity, pressure, and rationalization

Deceptive behavior involves the intentional misrepresentation of information to gain advantage or avoid consequences. Lying constitutes the most fundamental form of deceptive behavior, with research indicating that the average person tells 1-2 lies per day, though this varies significantly among individuals. Pathological lying, also known as pseudologia fantastica, represents an extreme form characterized by compulsive, excessive lying that serves no clear external purpose.

Fraud represents a specific category involving intentional misrepresentation to obtain money, property, or services through false pretenses. Contemporary examples include Bernie Madoff's Ponzi scheme and cryptocurrency fraud schemes that exploit cognitive biases and emotional vulnerabilities. Identity theft and social engineering attacks exploit human psychology through techniques like phishing, pretexting, and manipulation of cognitive biases such as authority bias and social proof.

Conspiracy theories and hoaxing represent forms of deceptive behavior involving the deliberate spread of false information to manipulate public opinion or create confusion. These behaviors exploit cognitive biases such as confirmation bias and motivated reasoning, often targeting emotionally charged topics to maximize viral spread and social impact.

=== Exploitation ===
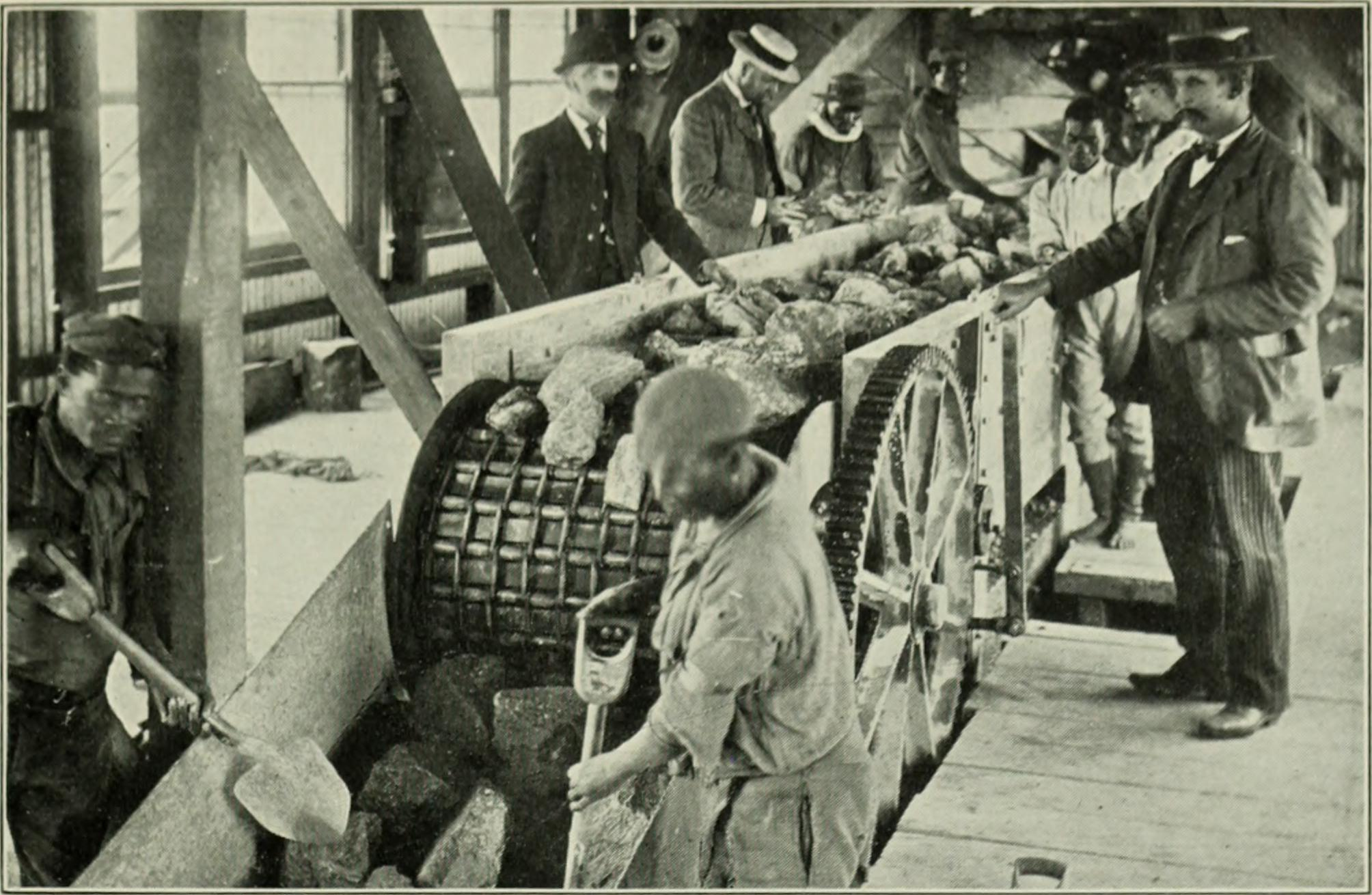
African American factory workers in the 1890s demonstrating labor exploitation through poor working conditions and low wages

Exploitation represents a fundamental form of antisocial behavior characterized by taking unfair advantage of others' vulnerabilities for personal or group benefit. Economic exploitation involves the systematic extraction of surplus value from workers' labor, manifesting through wage theft, unpaid overtime, and exploitation of migrant workers. The gig economy has created new forms of economic exploitation where workers bear costs and risks traditionally assumed by employers.

Sexual exploitation involves abuse of power imbalances to obtain sexual services through force, fraud, or coercion. Sex trafficking represents the most severe form, involving recruitment and transportation of persons for commercial sexual exploitation. Environmental exploitation involves systematic degradation of natural resources for economic benefit, often imposing costs on future generations and marginalized communities through environmental racism and climate change. Digital exploitation has emerged through "surveillance capitalism," where human experience is converted into behavioral data for predictive products sold to third parties.

Historical forms include slavery, which represented systematic ownership and forced labor of human beings as property, and unethical scientific experimentation that prioritized knowledge acquisition over participant welfare, leading to the establishment of the Nuremberg Code and other ethical oversight mechanisms.

=== Violent and aggressive behavior ===
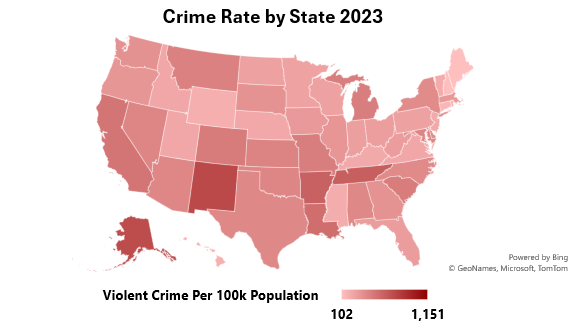
United States Map showing violent crime rate per state, circa 2023

Violent behavior represents a failure of control systems in the prefrontal cortex to regulate aggressive impulses. Domestic violence, assault, homicide, and mass violence all involve an imbalance between prefrontal regulatory influences and heightened activity in the amygdala and other limbic regions. Serial killing and mass shootings represent extreme forms characterized by planning and repetitive acts, while Gang violence and hate crimes often involve group dynamics that amplify individual aggressive tendencies through deindividuation and moral disengagement.

=== Sexual crimes and organized criminal behavior ===
Sexual crimes involve non-consensual sexual acts and represent severe violations of personal autonomy. Sexual assault, rape, child sexual abuse, and sex trafficking cause significant psychological trauma and often stem from distorted cognitive patterns, power motivations, and deficits in empathy.

Organized crime involves structured groups engaging in illegal activities for profit, including drug cartels, human trafficking organizations, and traditional crime families. These organizations operate through violence, corruption, and exploitation of illegal markets, providing social identity and economic opportunities to individuals who struggle with conventional social integration.

=== Extremism and psychological factors ===
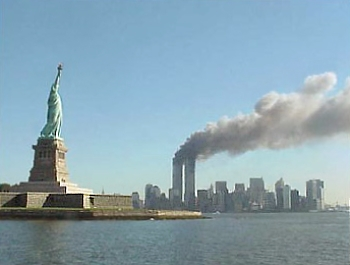
The twin towers on September 11, 2001 terrorist attacks, an example of extremist antisocial behavior

Extremism involves adoption of ideologies that justify violence against perceived enemies. Terrorism, hate crimes, and domestic terrorism share common psychological mechanisms despite different ideological content. The radicalization process typically involves a quest for personal significance, exposure to extremist narratives, and integration into radical networks.

Antisocial behavior is associated with abnormalities in brain systems involved in impulse control, emotional regulation, and moral reasoning. Genetic factors account for approximately 50% of the variance in antisocial behavior, with environmental factors such as childhood trauma, substance abuse, and social disadvantage contributing significantly. Antisocial personality disorder and psychopathy represent severe forms characterized by persistent patterns of disregard for others' rights, involving deficits in empathy, remorse, and behavioral control.

== Cognitive behavior ==
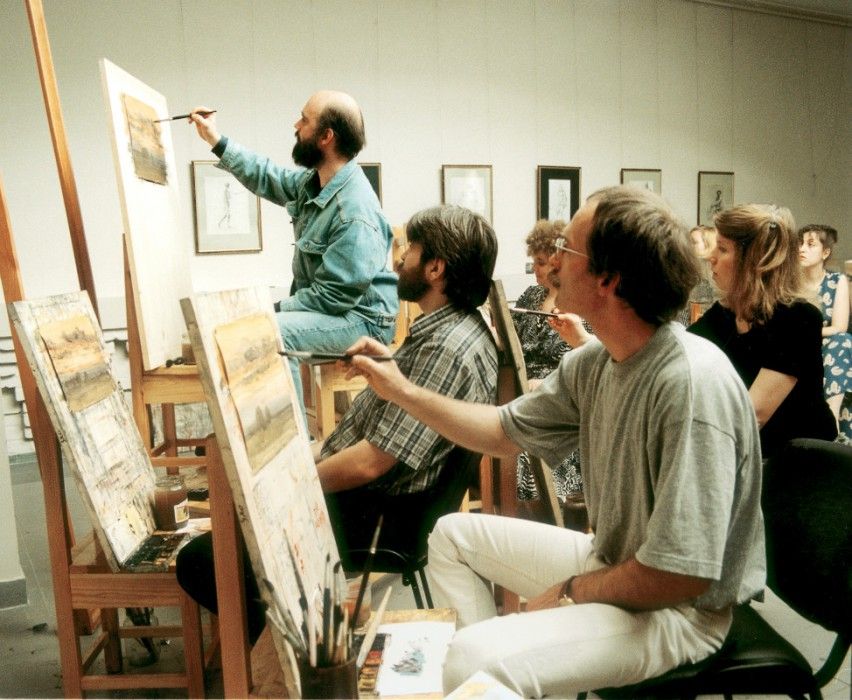
People being taught to paint in Volgograd, Russia (2013)

Human cognition is distinct from that of other animals. This is derived from biological traits of human cognition, but also from shared knowledge and development passed down culturally. Humans are able to learn from one another due to advanced theory of mind that allows knowledge to be obtained through education. The use of language allows humans to directly pass knowledge to one another. The human brain has neuroplasticity, allowing it to modify its features in response to new experiences. This facilitates learning in humans and leads to behaviors of practice, allowing the development of new skills in individual humans. Behavior carried out over time can be ingrained as a habit, where humans will continue to regularly engage in the behavior without consciously deciding to do so.

Humans engage in reason to make inferences with a limited amount of information. Most human reasoning is done automatically without conscious effort on the part of the individual. Reasoning is carried out by making generalizations from past experiences and applying them to new circumstances. Learned knowledge is acquired to make more accurate inferences about the subject. Deductive reasoning infers conclusions that are true based on logical premises, while inductive reasoning infers what conclusions are likely to be true based on context.

Emotion is a cognitive experience innate to humans. Basic emotions such as joy, distress, anger, fear, surprise, and disgust are common to all cultures, though social norms regarding the expression of emotion may vary. Other emotions come from higher cognition, such as, guilt, shame, embarrassment, pride, envy, and jealousy. These emotions develop over time rather than instantly and are more strongly influenced by cultural factors. Emotions are influenced by sensory information, such as color and music, and moods of happiness and sadness. Humans typically maintain a standard level of happiness or sadness determined by health and social relationships, though positive and negative events have short-term influences on mood. Humans often seek to improve the moods of one another through consolation, entertainment, and venting. Humans can also self-regulate mood through exercise and meditation.

Creativity is the use of previous ideas or resources to produce something original. It allows for innovation, adaptation to change, learning new information, and novel problem solving. Expression of creativity also supports quality of life. Creativity includes personal creativity, in which a person presents new ideas authentically, but it can also be expanded to social creativity, in which a community or society produces and recognizes ideas collectively. Creativity is applied in typical human life to solve problems as they occur. It also leads humans to carry out art and science. Individuals engaging in advanced creative work typically have specialized knowledge in that field, and humans draw on this knowledge to develop novel ideas. In art, creativity is used to develop new artistic works, such as visual art or music. In science, those with knowledge in a particular scientific field can use trial and error to develop theories that more accurately explain phenomena.

Religious behavior is a set of traditions that are followed based on the teachings of a religious belief system. The nature of religious behavior varies depending on the specific religious traditions. Most religious traditions involve variations of telling myths, practicing rituals, making certain things taboo, adopting symbolism, determining morality, experiencing altered states of consciousness, and believing in supernatural beings. Religious behavior is often demanding and has high time, energy, and material costs, and it conflicts with rational choice models of human behavior, though it does provide community-related benefits. Anthropologists offer competing theories as to why humans adopted religious behavior. Religious behavior is heavily influenced by social factors, and group involvement is significant in the development of an individual's religious behavior. Social structures such as religious organizations or family units allow the sharing and coordination of religious behavior. These social connections reinforce the cognitive behaviors associated with religion, encouraging orthodoxy and commitment. According to a Pew Research Center report, 54% of adults around the world state that religion is very important in their lives as of 2018.

== Psychological behavior ==
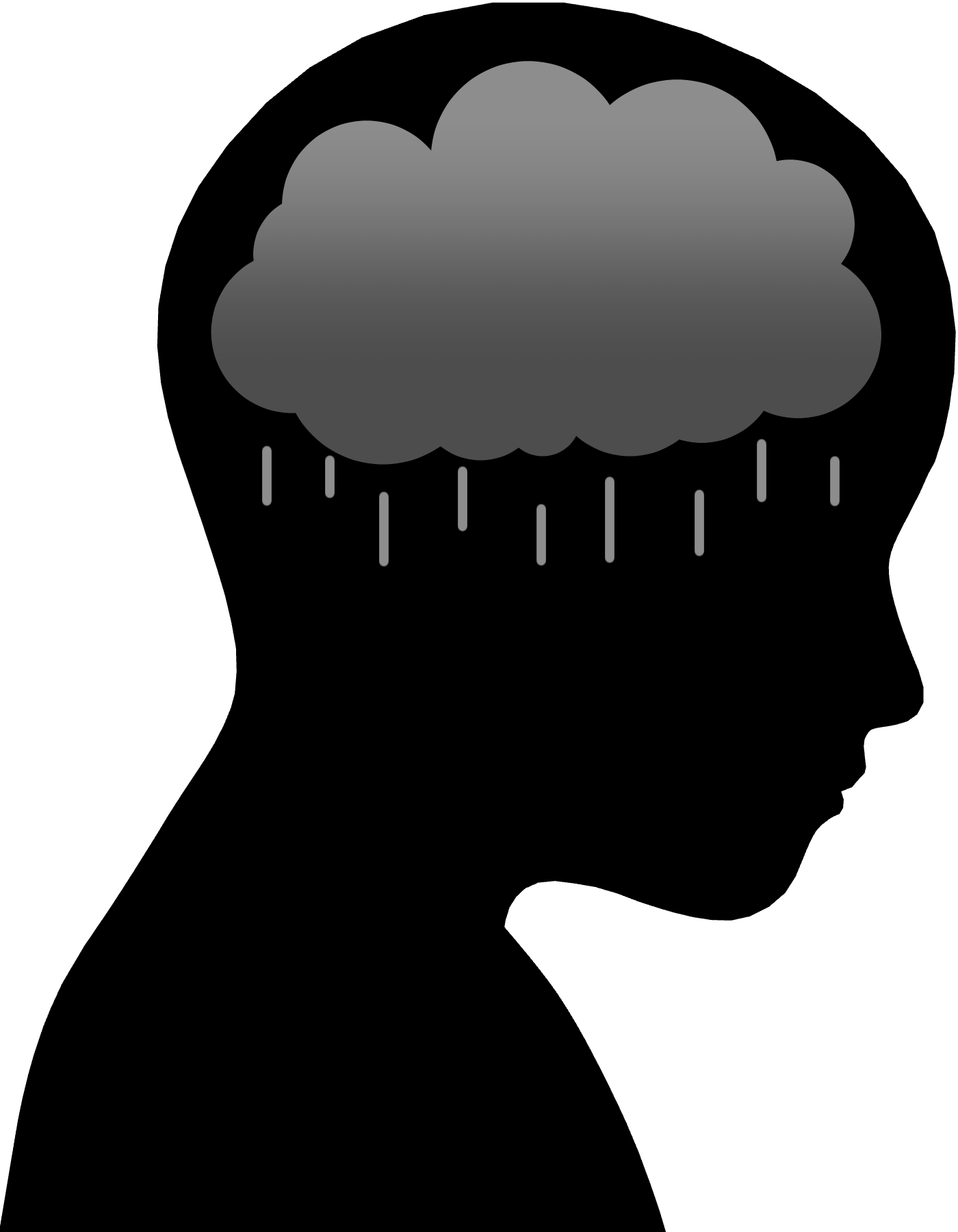
Mental health encompasses complex patterns of emotional, cognitive, and behavioral responses that individuals exhibit in managing their psychological well-being

Psychological behaviors encompass the complex patterns of emotional, cognitive, and behavioral responses that individuals exhibit in managing their mental well-being. These behaviors exist on a continuum and are influenced by both biological and environmental factors. Mental health behaviors include emotional regulation, stress responses, coping mechanisms, trauma responses, and psychological resilience.

=== Emotional regulation and stress response ===
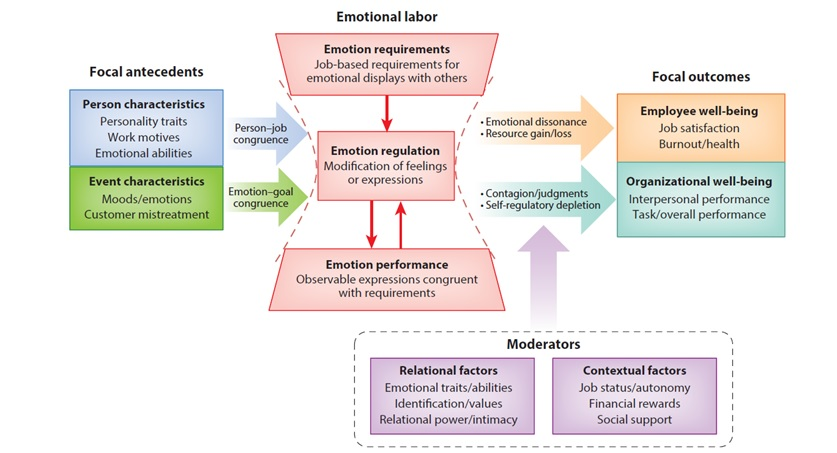
Emotional regulation involves complex neurobiological processes that help individuals manage their emotional responses to internal and external stimuli

Emotional regulation refers to the processes by which individuals manage, modify, and respond to their emotional experiences. These behaviors involve metacognitive awareness of one's emotional state and the implementation of strategies to modulate emotional responses. Emotional dysregulation serves as a transdiagnostic symptom across multiple mental health conditions, including anxiety disorders, substance use disorders, and major depressive disorder. Effective strategies include mindfulness practices, cognitive reappraisal, and behavioral activation.

Stress response behaviors represent adaptive mechanisms for dealing with challenging situations, involving both physiological changes and behavioral adaptations. Research using national population samples reveals that positive coping strategies demonstrate a strong predictive relationship with psychological well-being (standardized coefficient of 0.43), while negative coping strategies show strong association with psychological distress (standardized coefficient of 0.81).

=== Trauma response and resilience ===
Trauma response behaviors encompass immediate and long-term reactions following exposure to traumatic events, including fight, flight, freeze, and fawn responses. Initial responses typically include exhaustion, confusion, anxiety, dissociation, and heightened physical arousal. Long-term responses can develop into post-traumatic stress disorder (PTSD), which affects approximately 3.5% of adults annually.

Psychological resilience represents the ability to maintain psychological well-being and adaptive functioning in the face of adversity. Resilient behaviors include cognitive flexibility, maintaining optimism, developing strong social connections, and engaging in meaning-making activities. Resilience can be developed through cognitive-behavioral therapy, mindfulness training, and building self-efficacy.

=== Cognitive biases and decision-making ===
Cognitive biases systematically influence decision-making processes and can lead to errors in judgment and reasoning

Cognitive biases represent systematic patterns of deviation from rationality in judgment and decision-making that significantly influence human behavior. Common biases include confirmation bias, availability heuristic, and anchoring bias. Research in behavioral economics demonstrates that these biases have significant effects on economic decision-making, with explanatory variables accounting for approximately 30-45% of overall response variance in probabilistic judgment errors.

=== Addiction and compulsive behaviors ===
Addiction and compulsive behaviors represent persistent engagement in activities despite harmful consequences. Compulsive behavior consists of repetitive acts characterized by the feeling that one "has to" perform them while being aware that these acts are not aligned with overall goals. Addictive behaviors involve hijacking of the brain's dopamine system, particularly in the nucleus accumbens, leading to neuroadaptations that shift behavior from impulsive to compulsive patterns. Approximately 10% of the general population exhibits OCD-related sub-threshold symptoms that include compulsive behaviors.

=== Personality and individual differences ===
The Big Five personality model demonstrates how individual differences in personality traits influence psychological and behavioral patterns

Personality traits represent stable individual differences that significantly influence psychological behaviors and mental health outcomes. The Big Five personality model identifies five major dimensions that predict various behavioral patterns: extraversion, neuroticism, conscientiousness, agreeableness, and openness to experience. Neuroticism is particularly relevant as it predicts increased vulnerability to anxiety, depression, and stress-related disorders, while conscientiousness is associated with better self-regulation and more effective stress management.

=== Mental health interventions and positive psychology ===
Mental health intervention behaviors encompass therapeutic and self-directed actions to improve psychological well-being. Evidence-based approaches include Acceptance and Commitment Therapy (ACT), which focuses on developing psychological flexibility, and Dialectical Behavior Therapy (DBT), which teaches distress tolerance, interpersonal effectiveness, and emotion regulation skills. Contemporary interventions also incorporate technology-based solutions, including digital therapeutics and smartphone-based interventions.

Positive psychology behaviors encompass character strengths, positive emotions, and actions that allow individuals to build meaningful and fulfilling lives. These include practices such as gratitude expression, optimism cultivation, forgiveness, and engagement in activities that provide meaning and purpose. Research demonstrates that positive psychology interventions can effectively enhance well-being and reduce symptoms of depression and anxiety.

=== Cognitive and health behaviors ===
Memory and learning behaviors encompass psychological processes of acquiring, storing, and retrieving information that fundamentally shape human experience. Attention behaviors represent cognitive processes of selectively concentrating on specific information while filtering out distractions, with difficulties such as those seen in Attention-Deficit/Hyperactivity Disorder (ADHD) significantly impacting behavioral regulation and daily functioning.

Sleep behaviors encompass complex patterns of rest and circadian rhythms that fundamentally influence psychological well-being. Sleep psychology research demonstrates that sleep behaviors are causally related to mental health difficulties, with poor sleep increasing negative emotional responses while decreasing positive emotions. Health psychology behaviors encompass actions individuals take to maintain or improve their physical and mental health, with the three primary health behaviors of sleep, physical activity, and diet showing strong interconnected relationships with mental health and well-being.

== Physiological behavior ==
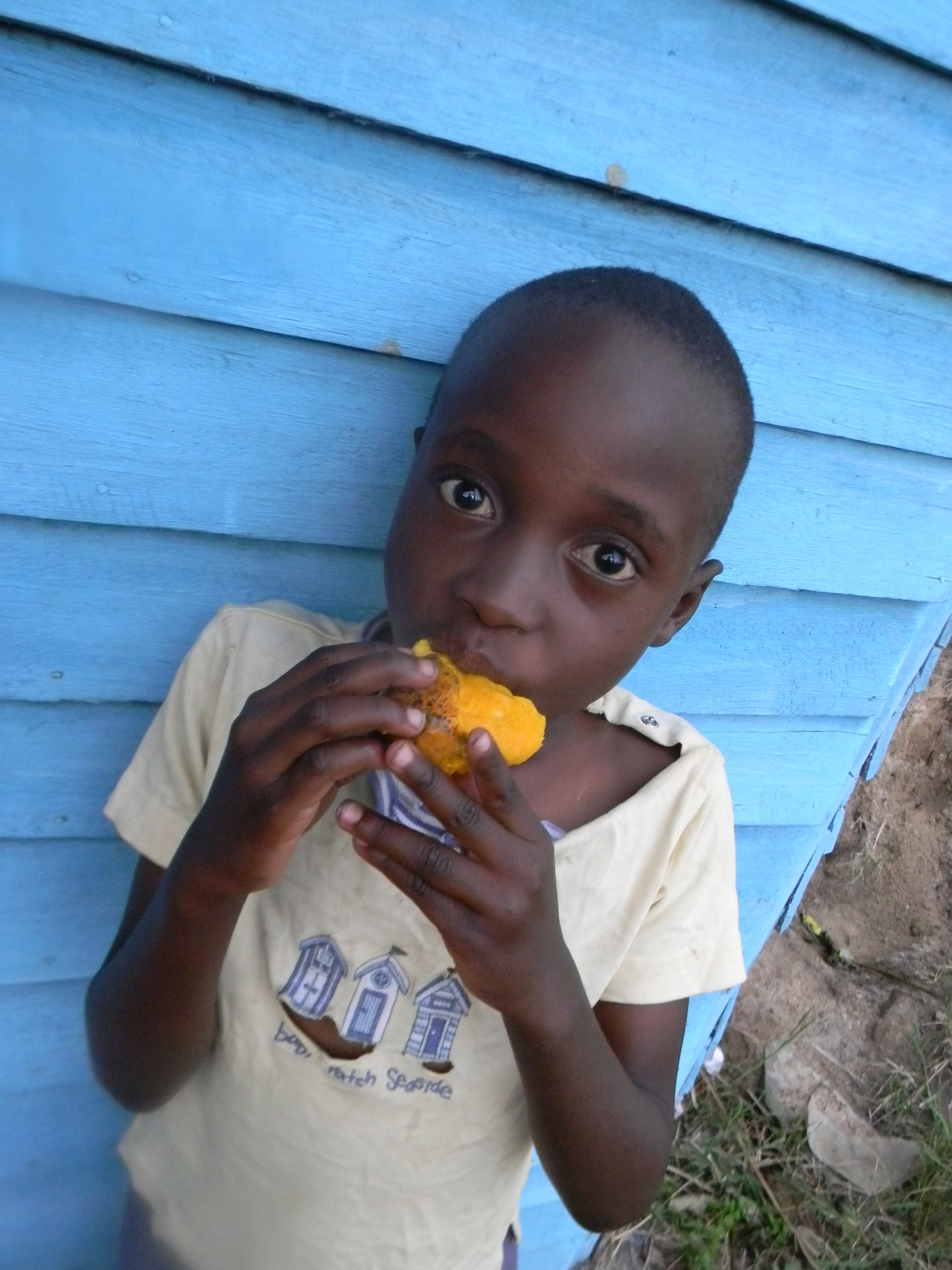
A boy eating in Harare, Zimbabwe (2017)

Humans undergo many behaviors common to animals to support the processes of the human body. Humans eat food to obtain nutrition. These foods may be chosen for their nutritional value, but they may also be eaten for pleasure. Eating often follows a food preparation process to make it more enjoyable. Humans dispose of waste through urination and defecation. Excrement is often treated as taboo, particularly in developed and urban communities where sanitation is more widely available and excrement has no value as fertilizer. Humans also regularly engage in sleep, based on homeostatic and circadian factors. The circadian rhythm causes humans to require sleep at a regular pattern and is typically calibrated to the day-night cycle and sleep-wake habits. Homeostasis is also maintained, causing longer sleep longer after periods of sleep deprivation. The human sleep cycle takes place over 90 minutes, and it repeats 3–5 times during normal sleep.

There are also unique behaviors that humans undergo to maintain physical health. Humans have developed medicine to prevent and treat illnesses. In industrialized nations, eating habits that favor better nutrition, hygienic behaviors that promote sanitation, medical treatment to eradicate diseases, and the use of birth control significantly improve human health. Humans can also engage in exercise beyond that required for survival to maintain health. Humans engage in hygiene to limit exposure to dirt and pathogens. Some of these behaviors are adaptive while others are learned. Basic behaviors of disgust evolved as an adaptation to prevent contact with sources of pathogens, resulting in a biological aversion to feces, body fluids, rotten food, and animals that are commonly disease vectors. Personal grooming, disposal of human corpses, use of sewerage, and use of cleaning agents are hygienic behaviors common to most human societies.

Humans reproduce sexually, engaging in sexual intercourse for both reproduction and sexual pleasure. Human reproduction is closely associated with human sexuality and an instinctive desire to procreate, though humans are unique in that they intentionally control the number of offspring that they produce. Humans engage in a large variety of reproductive behaviors relative to other animals, with various mating structures that include forms of monogamy, polygyny, and polyandry. How humans engage in mating behavior is heavily influenced by cultural norms and customs. Unlike most mammals, humans ovulate spontaneously rather than seasonally, with a menstrual cycle that typically lasts 25–35 days.

Humans are bipedal and move by walking. Human walking corresponds to the bipedal gait cycle, which involves alternating heel contact and toe off with the ground and slight elevation and rotation of the pelvis. Balance while walking is learned during the first 7–9 years of life, and individual humans develop unique gaits while learning to displace weight, adjust center of mass, and coordinate neural control with movement. Humans can achieve higher speed by running. The endurance running hypothesis proposes that humans can outpace most other animals over long distances through running, though human running causes a higher rate of energy exertion. The human body self-regulates through perspiration during periods of exertion, allowing humans more endurance than other animals. The human hand is prehensile and capable of grasping objects and applying force with control over the hand's dexterity and grip strength. This allows the use of complex tools by humans.

== Economic behavior ==
Humans engage in predictable behaviors when considering economic decisions, and these behaviors may or may not be rational. Humans make basic decisions through cost–benefit analysis and the acceptable rate of return at the minimum risk. Human economic decision making is often reference dependent, in which options are weighed in reference to the status quo rather than absolute gains and losses. Humans are also loss averse, fearing loss rather than seeking gain. Advanced economic behavior developed in humans after the Neolithic Revolution and the development of agriculture. These developments led to a sustainable supply of resources that allowed specialization in more complex societies.

=== Work ===
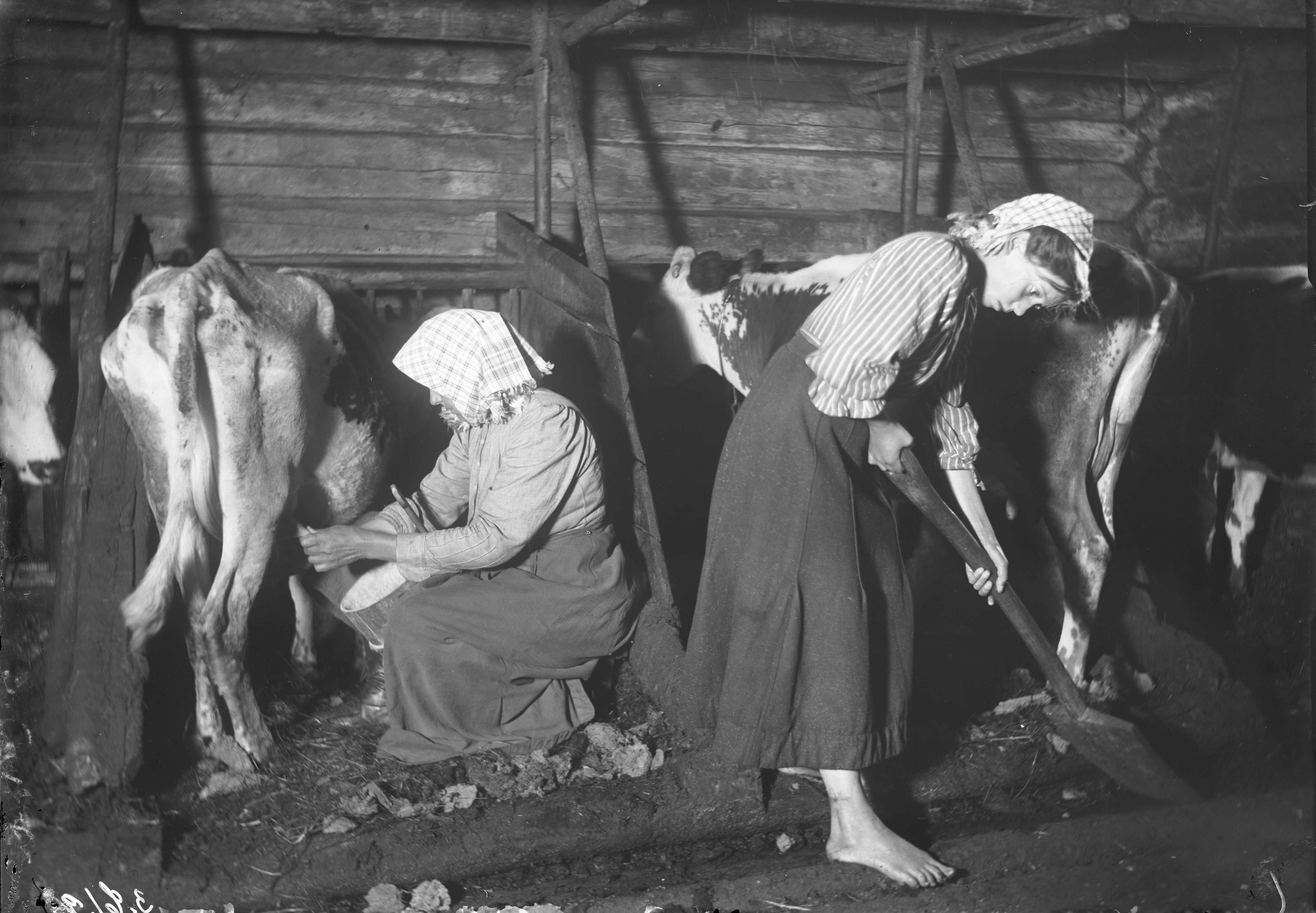
Women tending to farm animals in Mangskogs, Sweden (1911)

The nature of human work is defined by the complexity of society. The simplest societies are tribes that work primarily for sustenance as hunter-gatherers. In this sense, work is not a distinct activity but a constant that makes up all parts of life, as all members of the society must work consistently to stay alive.

More advanced societies developed after the Neolithic Revolution, emphasizing work in agricultural and pastoral settings. In these societies, production is increased, ending the need for constant work and allowing some individuals to specialize and work in areas outside of food-production. This also created non-laborious work, as increasing occupational complexity required some individuals to specialize in technical knowledge and administration. Laborious work in these societies has variously been carried out by slaves, serfs, peasants, and guild craftsmen.

The nature of work changed significantly during the Industrial Revolution in which the factory system was developed for use by industrializing nations. In addition to further increasing general quality of life, this development changed the dynamic of work. Under the factory system, workers increasingly collaborate with others, employers serve as authority figures during work hours, and forced labor is largely eradicated. Further changes occur in post-industrial societies where technological advance makes industries obsolete, replacing them with mass production and service industries.

Humans approach work differently based on both physical and personal attributes, and some work with more effectiveness and commitment than others. Some find work to contribute to personal fulfillment, while others work only out of necessity. Work can also serve as an identity, with individuals identifying themselves based on their occupation. Work motivation is complex, both contributing to and subtracting from various human needs. The primary motivation for work is for material gain, which takes the form of money in modern societies. It may also serve to create self-esteem and personal worth, provide activity, gain respect, and express creativity. Modern work is typically categorized as laborious or blue-collar work and non-laborious or white-collar work.

=== Leisure ===
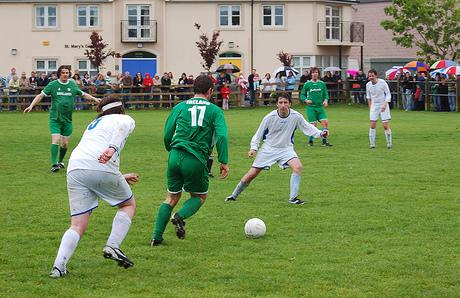
Men playing association football in Kilkenny, Ireland (2007)

Leisure is activity or lack of activity that takes place outside of work. It provides relaxation, entertainment, and improved quality of life for individuals. Engaging in leisure can be beneficial for physical and mental health. It may be used to seek temporary relief from psychological stress, to produce positive emotions, or to facilitate social interaction. However, leisure can also facilitate health risks and negative emotions caused by boredom, substance abuse, or high-risk behavior.

Leisure may be defined as serious or casual. Serious leisure behaviors involve non-professional pursuit of arts and sciences, the development of hobbies, or career volunteering in an area of expertise. Casual leisure behaviors provide short-term gratification, but they do not provide long-term gratification or personal identity. These include play, relaxation, casual social interaction, volunteering, passive entertainment, active entertainment, and sensory stimulation. Passive entertainment is typically derived from mass media, which may include written works or digital media. Active entertainment involves games in which individuals participate. Sensory stimulation is immediate gratification from behaviors such as eating or sexual intercourse.

=== Consumption ===
Humans operate as consumers that obtain and use goods. All production is ultimately designed for consumption, and consumers adapt their behavior based on the availability of production. Mass consumption began during the Industrial Revolution, caused by the development of new technologies that allowed for increased production. Many factors affect a consumer's decision to purchase goods through trade. They may consider the nature of the product, its associated cost, the convenience of purchase, and the nature of advertising around the product. Cultural factors may influence this decision, as different cultures value different things, and subcultures may have different priorities when it comes to purchasing decisions. Social class, including wealth, education, and occupation may affect one's purchasing behavior. A consumer's interpersonal relationships and reference groups may also influence purchasing behavior.

== Digital behavior ==
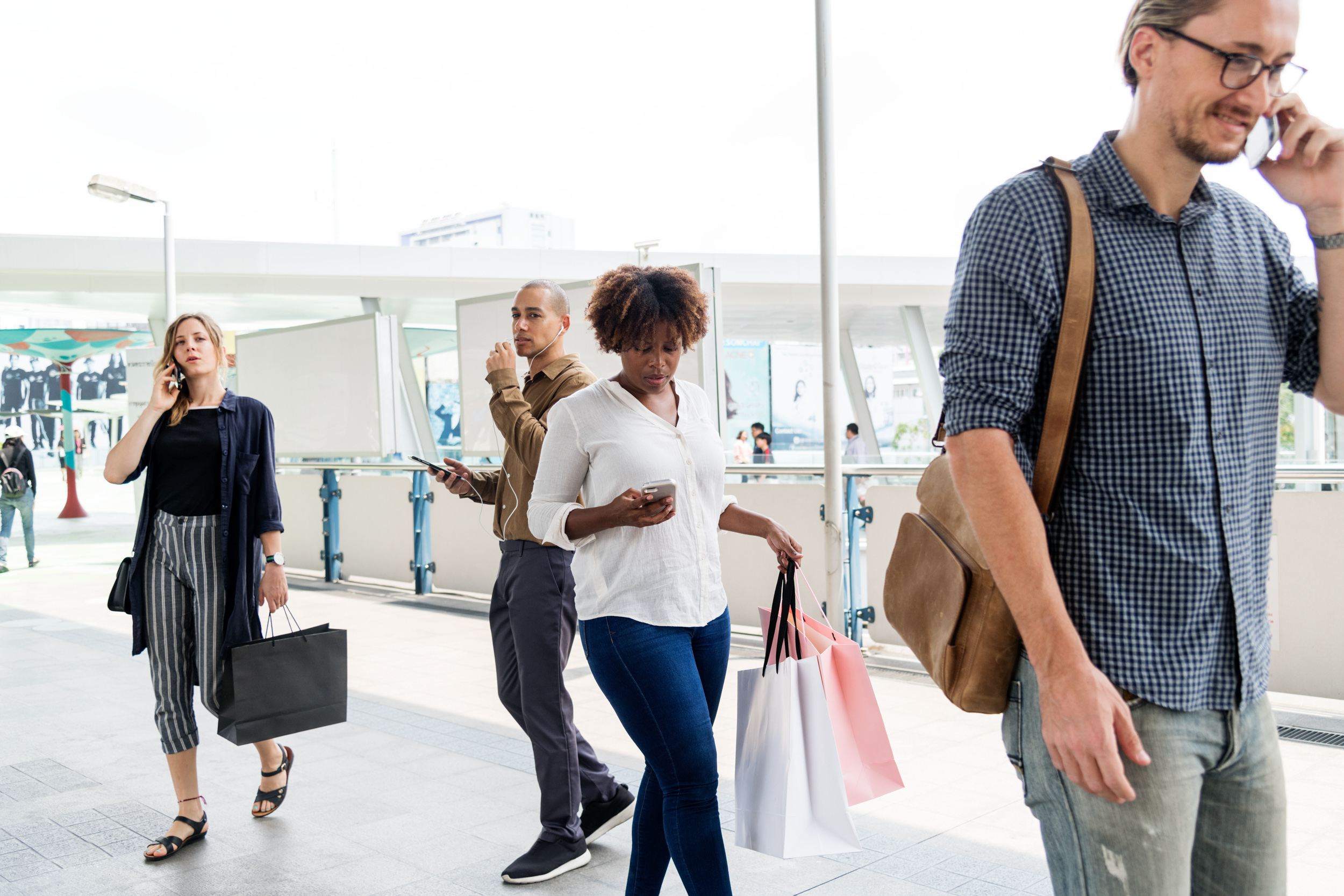
People using smartphones in public, illustrating the ubiquity of digital behavior in modern society

Digital behavior encompasses human actions and decision-making processes that occur through digital technology systems, including smartphones, social media platforms, and internet connections. Modern humans spend an average of 6.5 hours per day engaged in online activities, primarily for information retrieval and social interaction. Digital environments have fundamentally altered how humans interact and process information, creating new social patterns that differ from traditional face-to-face relationships and establishing complex effects on mental health and cognitive development.

=== Social media and interpersonal relationships ===
Social media platforms have fundamentally changed human social behavior by establishing new communication methods and relationship dynamics. Heavy social media use has been linked to measurable changes in brain structure, particularly in areas associated with addictive behavior and reward processing. Longitudinal studies of children aged 9–11 years show that high social media usage correlates with accelerated changes in cerebellum development over four-year periods.

Prolonged use of platforms such as Facebook has been associated with symptoms of depression, anxiety, and stress. High social media users show 2-3 times higher odds of perceived social isolation compared to low users, with this association being particularly strong among young adults aged 19–32. However, research also indicates that internet usage can increase family communication, with studies showing approximately 102 minutes of increased weekly family contact time for each standard deviation increase in usage.

=== Cyberbullying and digital harassment ===
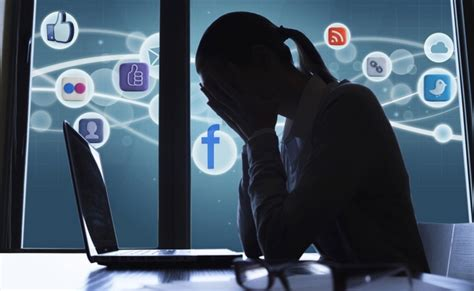
Cyberbullying represents a form of digital harassment with serious mental health consequences for victims

Cyberbullying has emerged as a significant form of digital behavior with serious public health implications, particularly among adolescents. This behavior involves using digital technologies to repeatedly harm, intimidate, or harass others, differing from traditional bullying through anonymity, 24/7 accessibility, and potential for viral spread of harmful content. Cyberbullying victimization affects 13.99% to 57.5% of children and adolescents globally, with females, school-aged populations, and frequent internet users being more vulnerable.

The effects on victims include increased rates of depression, anxiety, suicidal behavior, and academic problems. Cyberbullying involving pictures or video images tends to be most harmful to adolescents, with approximately 32% of targets experiencing stress symptoms and 38% reporting emotional distress.

=== Technology addiction and digital wellness ===
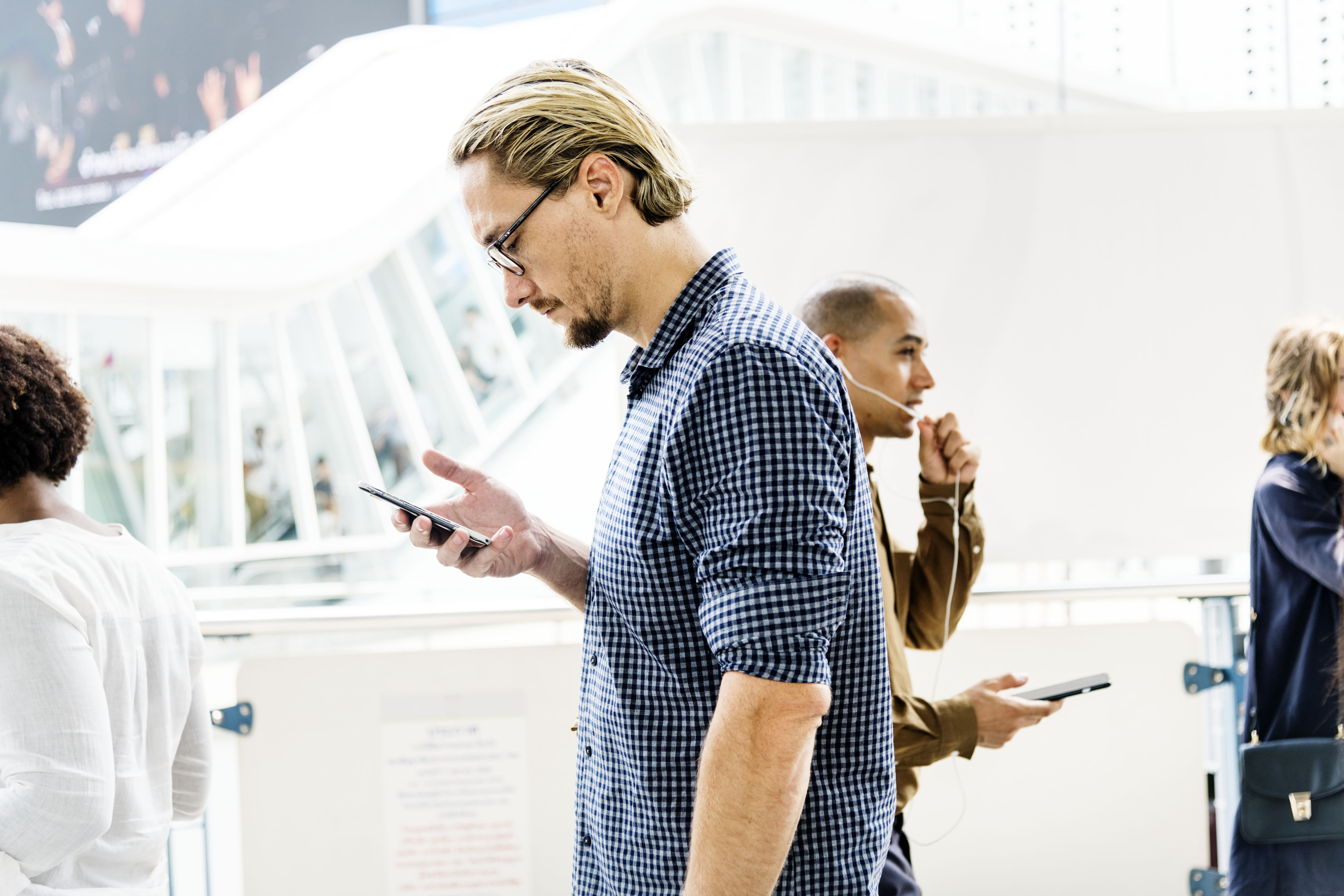
Excessive screen time is connected to various health issues

Smartphone addiction affects approximately 6.3% of the global smartphone user population, though prevalence rates in certain groups can range from 21.7% to 67.8%. Women consistently score higher than men in problematic smartphone use across multiple countries, and medical students show particularly high rates of addiction, ranging from 15.6% to 81.1%.

Heavy smartphone usage is associated with emotion-regulation difficulties, impulsive behavior, decreased cognitive abilities, sleep disturbances, and reduced brain gray matter volume. However, the relationship between technology use and cognitive health is complex, as moderate digital technology use has been associated with reduced risk of cognitive impairment and slower rates of cognitive decline in older adults.

=== Digital consumer behavior and online decision-making ===
Digital environments have transformed traditional consumer behavior through data-driven personalization and algorithmic mediation systems. Artificial intelligence and machine learning algorithms analyze vast amounts of user data to predict and influence purchasing decisions, fundamentally changing how consumers discover and evaluate products. Modern consumers conduct extensive online research before making purchases, with social media platforms playing increasingly important roles in product discovery and purchase decisions. Digital behavior patterns can be used to predict individual cognitive abilities and preferences, providing opportunities for understanding and influencing consumer decision-making processes through sophisticated forms of targeted marketing that adapt to individual user behaviors in real-time.

== Gender and sexual behavior ==
Gender symbols representing the diversity of gender identity and expression in human behavior

Gender and sexual behavior encompass the complex patterns of identity expression, intimate relationships, and reproductive conduct that characterize human experience across cultures and developmental stages. These behaviors reflect the interaction of biological, psychological, social, and cultural factors that shape how individuals understand and express their gender identity and engage in sexual relationships. Research demonstrates that gender and sexual behaviors exist along continuums rather than discrete categories, with significant individual variation in expression and experience. Contemporary understanding recognizes the distinction between biological sex, gender identity, gender expression, and sexual orientation as separate but interrelated dimensions of human experience.

=== Gender identity and expression ===
The transgender pride flag representing gender diversity and the recognition that gender identity exists beyond traditional binary categories

Gender identity development begins early in childhood and involves complex interactions between biological predispositions, cognitive development, and social learning processes. Most children develop a stable sense of gender identity by ages 3–5, though expression and understanding may continue evolving throughout the lifespan. Cross-cultural studies reveal significant variation in gender roles and expectations, with many cultures recognizing gender categories beyond the Western binary, including the hijra of South Asia, the fa'afafine of Samoa, and the Two-Spirit people of various Native American tribes.

Neurobiological research has identified potential biological contributions to gender identity development, including prenatal hormone exposure, genetic factors, and brain structure differences. Studies examining brain imaging data suggest that individuals with gender dysphoria may show brain activation patterns more similar to their experienced gender than their assigned sex at birth. Gender expression varies significantly across individuals and cultures, with research indicating that supportive environments for diverse gender expressions are associated with better mental health outcomes.

=== Sexual orientation and attraction ===
The Kinsey scale illustrating the continuum of sexual orientation from exclusively heterosexual to exclusively homosexual behavior

Sexual orientation encompasses complex patterns of emotional, romantic, and sexual attraction that exist along a continuum rather than in discrete categories. Biological research has identified several contributing factors, including genetic influences, prenatal hormone exposure, and birth order effects. The fraternal birth order effect shows that homosexual men have on average a greater number of older brothers than heterosexual men, with the incidence of homosexuality increasing by approximately 33% with each older brother, supporting hypotheses about maternal immune responses affecting fetal brain development.

Research indicates that sexual orientation likely results from complex interactions between multiple genetic variants, environmental factors, and developmental processes. Epigenetic mechanisms may also play important roles in sexual orientation development.

=== Intimate relationships and sexual behavior ===
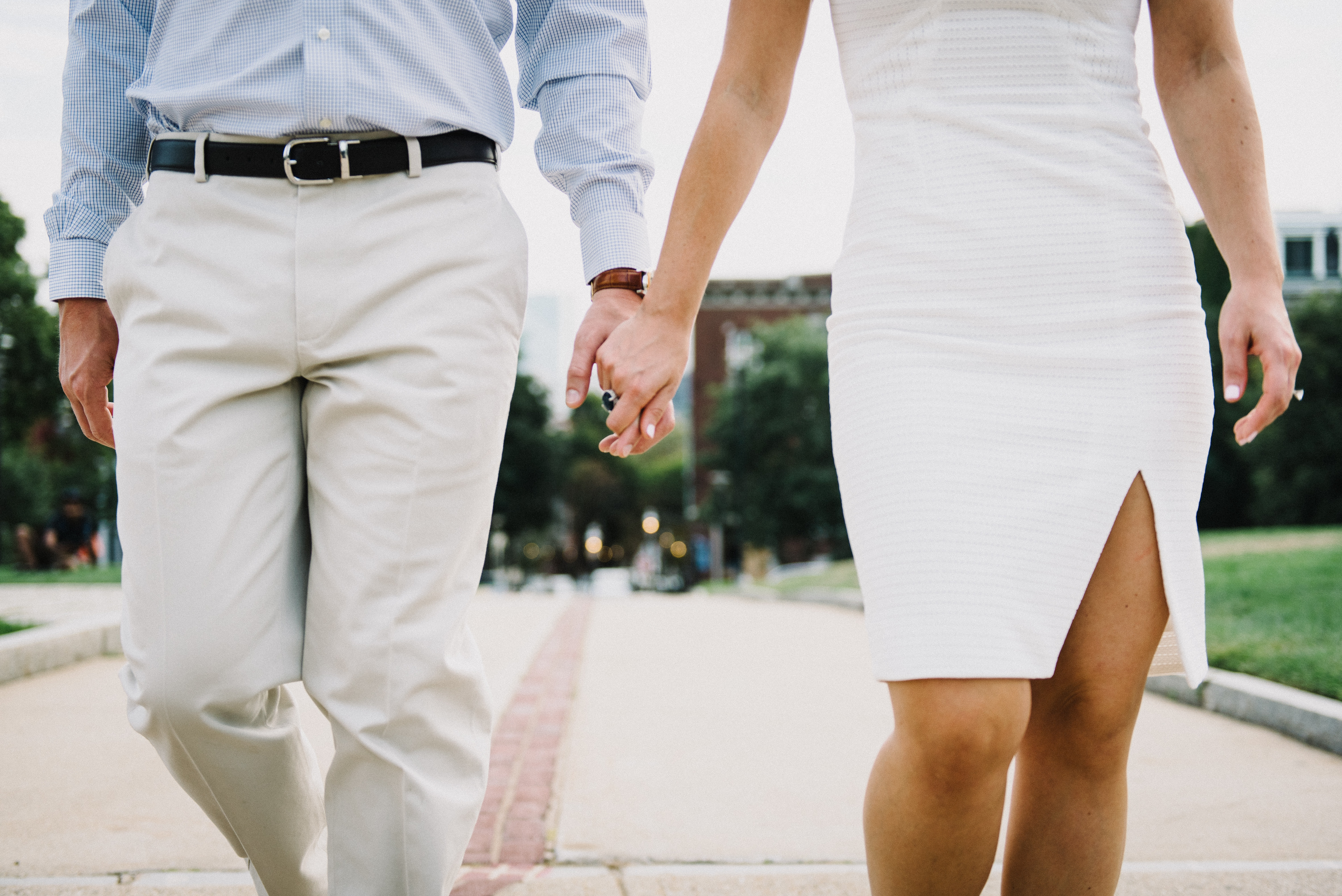
A couple holding hands, demonstrating pair bonding behavior that characterizes human intimate relationships across diverse sexual orientations

Human intimate relationships involve complex behavioral patterns of attachment, communication, and mutual support that extend beyond reproductive functions. Pair bonding behaviors include emotional intimacy, physical affection, shared activities, and long-term commitment, serving important psychological and social functions regardless of sexual orientation or reproductive capacity. Attachment theory provides a framework for understanding how early caregiving experiences influence later relationship behaviors, with secure attachment styles typically demonstrating greater relationship satisfaction and more effective communication skills.

Sexual behavior encompasses a wide range of activities serving reproductive, relational, and recreational functions. Research indicates significant variation in sexual behavior patterns across individuals, cultures, and historical periods, reflecting the complex interplay of biological drives, psychological factors, and social influences. Studies consistently show that comprehensive sexual education programs are associated with delayed sexual initiation, increased contraceptive use, and reduced rates of sexually transmitted infections. Contemporary research recognizes diverse relationship structures beyond traditional monogamous partnerships, with relationship satisfaction depending more on communication quality, mutual respect, and shared values than on specific relationship structures.

=== Psychological and social implications ===
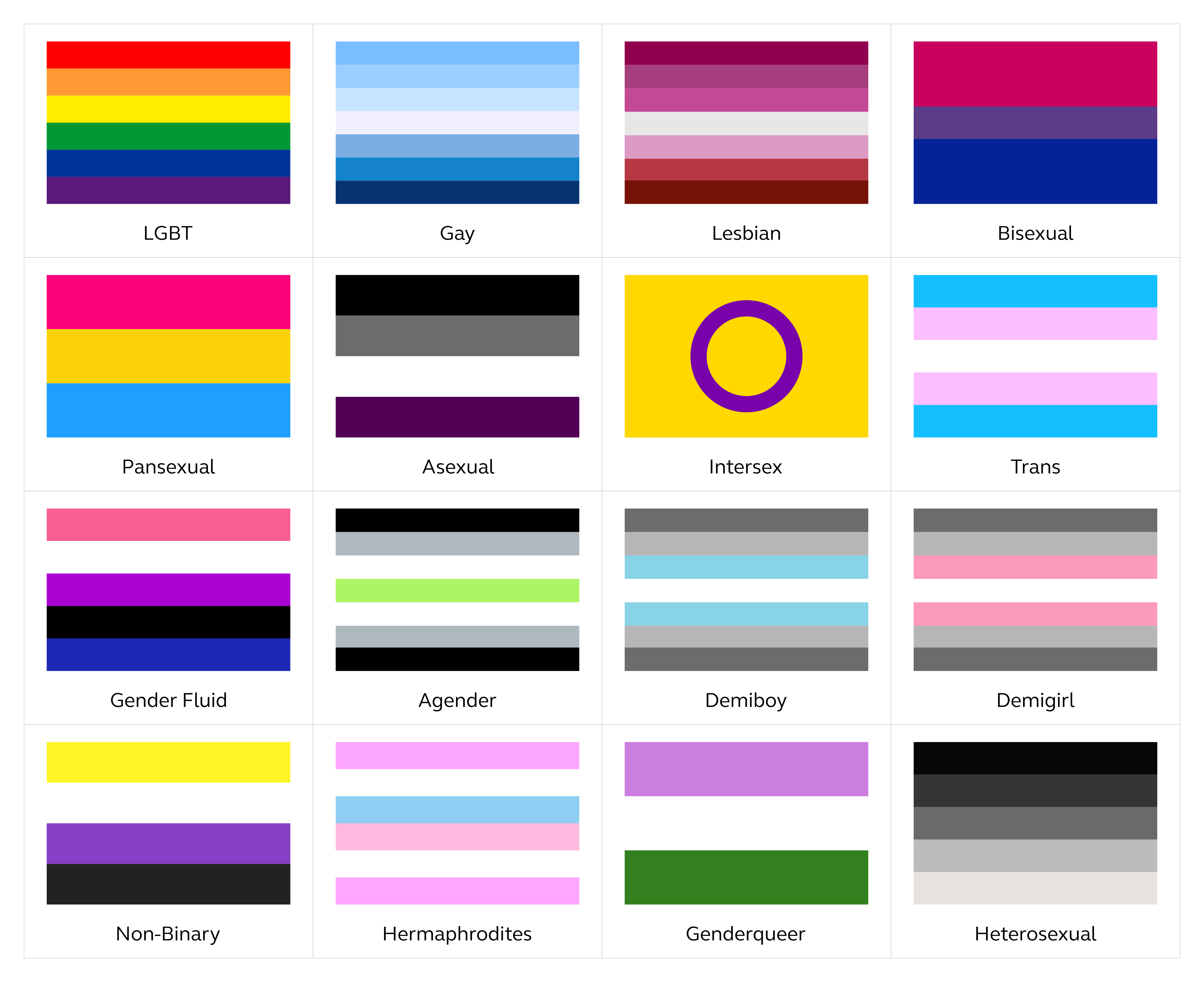
Pride flags representing diverse sexual orientations and gender identities, symbolizing the psychological importance of identity affirmation and social acceptance

The psychological implications of gender and sexual behavior significantly impact mental health, social relationships, and overall well-being. Research consistently demonstrates that individuals who experience acceptance and affirmation of their gender identity and sexual orientation show better mental health outcomes, including lower rates of depression, anxiety, and suicidal ideation. Conversely, experiences of rejection, discrimination, and minority stress are associated with significant psychological distress and increased risk of mental health problems.

Minority stress theory explains how stigma, prejudice, and discrimination create chronic stress for sexual and gender minorities, leading to mental health disparities. LGBTQ+ individuals experience higher rates of depression, anxiety, substance abuse, and suicide attempts compared to heterosexual and cisgender populations, though these disparities appear largely attributable to social factors rather than inherent aspects of diverse sexual orientations or gender identities. Social support and community connection play crucial roles in promoting positive outcomes, with family acceptance, peer support, and access to LGBTQ+-affirming communities significantly improving mental health and well-being. Historical analysis shows that attitudes toward sexual behavior and gender expression have varied dramatically across time periods and cultural contexts, with contemporary globalization leading to both increased awareness of diversity and, in some contexts, increased persecution of sexual and gender minorities.

== Ecological behavior ==
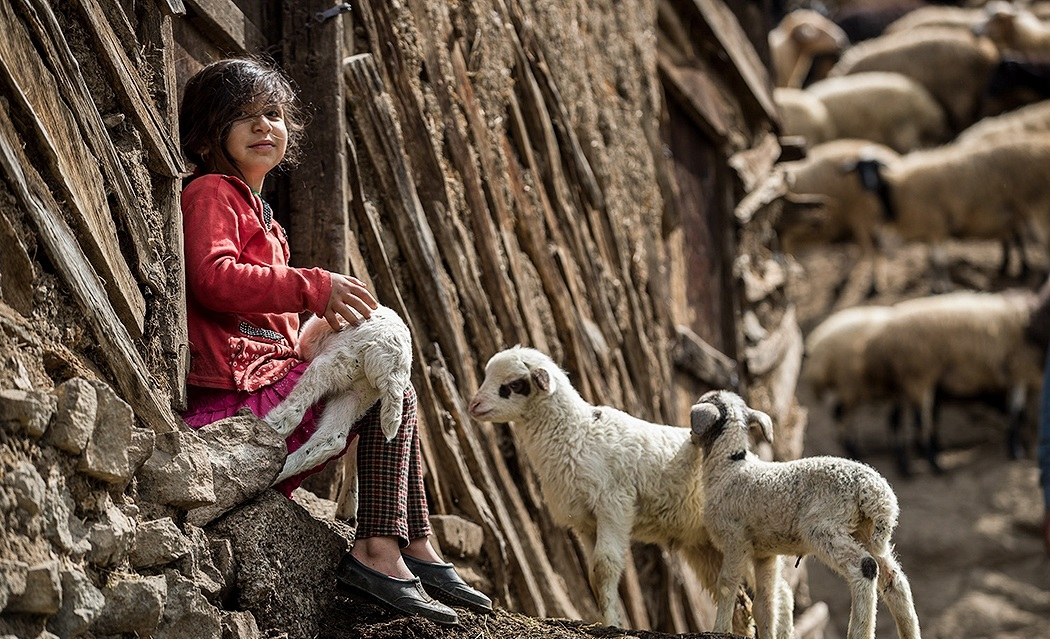
A girl with lambs in Gilandeh, Iran (2018)

Like all living things, humans live in ecosystems and interact with other organisms. Human behavior is affected by the environment in which a human lives, and environments are affected by human habitation. Humans have also developed man-made ecosystems such as urban areas and agricultural land. Geography and landscape ecology determine how humans are distributed within an ecosystem, both naturally and through planned urban morphology.

Humans exercise control over the animals that live within their environment. Domesticated animals are trained and cared for by humans. Humans can develop social and emotional bonds with animals in their care. Pets are kept for companionship within human homes, including dogs and cats that have been bred for domestication over many centuries. Livestock animals, such as cattle, sheep, goats, and poultry, are kept on agricultural land to produce animal products. Domesticated animals are also kept in laboratories for animal testing. Non-domesticated animals are sometimes kept in nature reserves and zoos for tourism and conservation.

== Causes and factors ==
Human behavior is influenced by biological and cultural elements. The structure and agency debate considers whether human behavior is predominantly led by individual human impulses or by external structural forces. Behavioral genetics considers how human behavior is affected by inherited traits. Though genes do not guarantee certain behaviors, certain traits can be inherited that make individuals more likely to engage in certain behaviors or express certain personalities. An individual's environment can also affect behavior, often in conjunction with genetic factors. An individual's personality and attitudes affect how behaviors are expressed, formed in conjunction by genetic and environmental factors.

=== Age ===
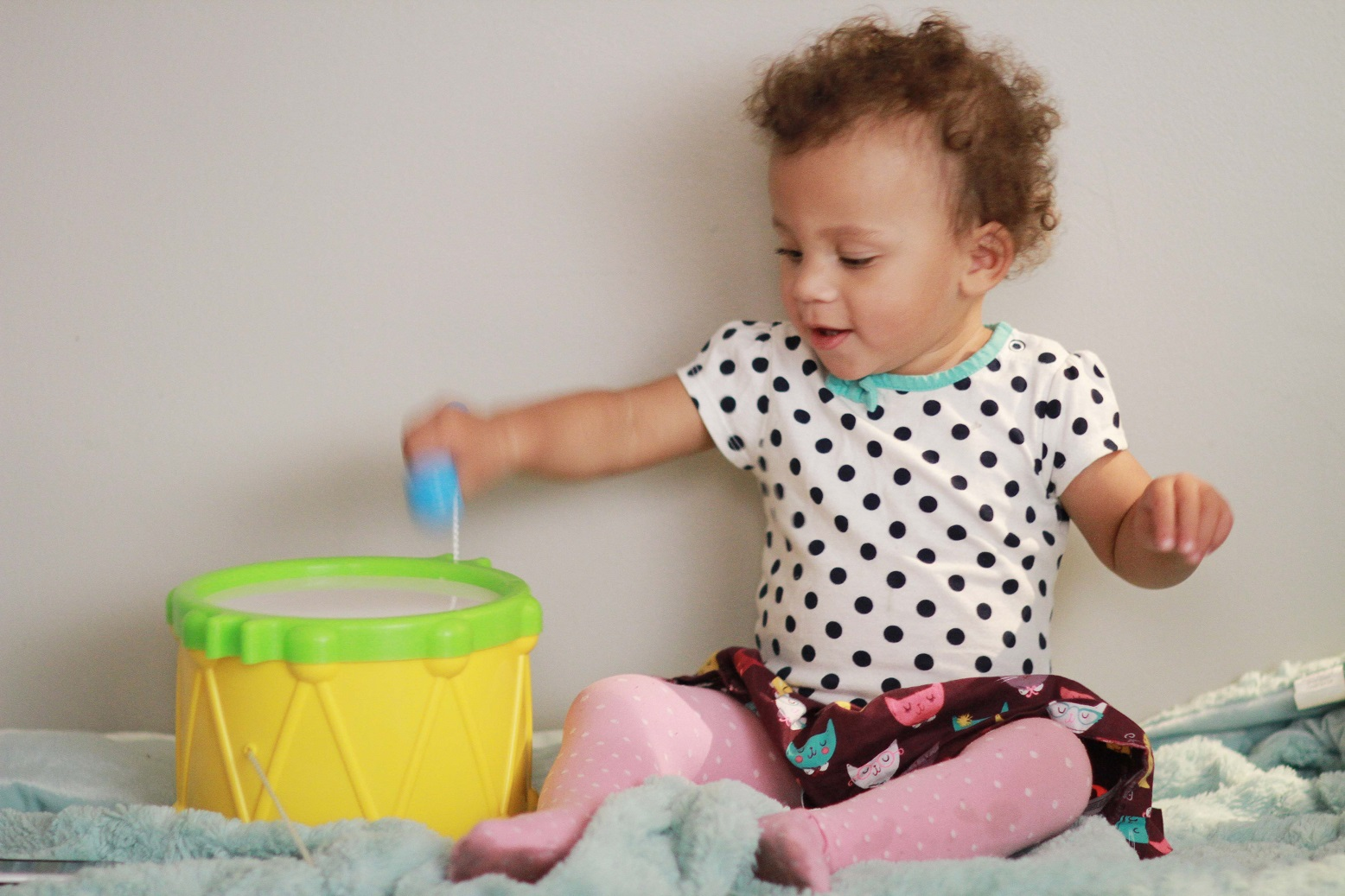
An infant engaging in play in Los Angeles, California (2015)

Infants

Infants are limited in their ability to interpret their surroundings shortly after birth. Object permanence and understanding of motion typically develop within the first six months of an infant's life, though the specific cognitive processes are not understood. The ability to mentally categorize different concepts and objects that they perceive also develops within the first year. Infants are quickly able to discern their body from their surroundings and often take interest in their own limbs or actions they cause by two months of age.

Infants practice imitation of other individuals to engage socially and learn new behaviors. In young infants, this involves imitating facial expressions, and imitation of tool use takes place within the first year. Communication develops over the first year, and infants begin using gestures to communicate intention around nine to ten months of age. Verbal communication develops more gradually, taking form during the second year of age.

Children

Children develop fine motor skills shortly after infancy, in the range of three to six years of age, allowing them to engage in behaviors using the hands and eye–hand coordination and perform basic activities of self sufficiency. Children begin expressing more complex emotions in the three- to six-year-old range, including humor, empathy, and altruism, as well engaging in creativity and inquiry. Aggressive behaviors also become varied at this age as children engage in increased physical aggression before learning to favor diplomacy over aggression. Children at this age can express themselves using language with basic grammar.

As children grow older, they develop emotional intelligence. Young children engage in basic social behaviors with peers, typically forming friendships centered on play with individuals of the same age and gender. Behaviors of young children are centered around play, which allows them to practice physical, cognitive, and social behaviors. Basic self-concept first develops as children grow, particularly centered around traits such as gender and ethnicity, and behavior is heavily affected by peers for the first time.

Adolescents

Adolescents undergo changes in behavior caused by puberty and the associated changes in hormone production. Production of testosterone increases sensation seeking and sensitivity to rewards in adolescents as well as aggression and risk-taking in adolescent boys. Production of estradiol causes similar risk-taking behavior among adolescent girls. The new hormones cause changes in emotional processing that allow for close friendships, stronger motivations and intentions, and adolescent sexuality.

Adolescents undergo social changes on a large scale, developing a full self-concept and making autonomous decisions independently of adults. They typically become more aware of social norms and social cues than children, causing an increase in self-consciousness and adolescent egocentrism that guides behavior in social settings throughout adolescence.

=== Culture and environment ===
Human brains, as with those of all mammals, are neuroplastic. This means that the structure of the brain changes over time as neural pathways are altered in response to the environment. Many behaviors are learned through interaction with others during early development of the brain. Human behavior is distinct from the behavior of other animals in that it is heavily influenced by culture and language. Social learning allows humans to develop new behaviors by following the example of others. Culture is also the guiding influence that defines social norms.

=== Physiology ===
Neurotransmitters, hormones, and metabolism are all recognized as biological factors in human behavior.

Physical disabilities can prevent individuals from engaging in typical human behavior or necessitate alternative behaviors. Accommodations and accessibility are often made available for individuals with physical disabilities in developed nations, including health care, assistive technology, and vocational services. Severe disabilities are associated with increased leisure time but also with a lower satisfaction in the quality of leisure time. Productivity and health both commonly undergo long-term decline following the onset of a severe disability. Mental disabilities are those that directly affect cognitive and social behavior. Common mental disorders include mood disorders, anxiety disorders, personality disorders, and substance dependence.

== See also ==
- Behavioral modernity
- Behaviorism
- Cultural ecology
- Human behavioral ecology

== Bibliography ==
- Bremner, Gavin; Wachs, Theodore D., eds. (2010). The Wiley-Blackwell Handbook of Infant Development. Vol. 1: Basic Research (2nd ed.). Wiley-Blackwell. ISBN 978-1-4443-3273-5.
- Charlesworth, Leanne Wood (2019). "Early Childhood". In Hutchison, Elizabeth D. (ed.). Dimensions of Human Behavior: The Changing Life Course (6th ed.). SAGE Publications. pp. 327–395. ISBN 978-1-5443-3934-4. LCCN 2018021374.
- Duck, Steve (2007). Human Relationships (4th ed.). SAGE Publications. ISBN 978-1-4129-2999-8.
- Evans, Dylan (2003). Emotion: A Very Short Introduction. Oxford University Press. ISBN 978-0-19-280461-7.
- Goode, Erich (2015). "The Sociology of Deviance: An Introduction". In Goode, Erich (ed.). The Handbook of Deviance. Wiley. pp. 3–29. doi:10.1002/9781118701386. ISBN 978-1-118-70132-4.
- Longino, Helen E. (2013). Studying Human Behavior: How Scientists Investigate Aggression and Sexuality. University of Chicago Press. doi:10.7208/9780226921822 (inactive 23 May 2026). ISBN 978-0-226-92182-2.
- Neff, Walter S. (1985). Work and Human Behavior (3rd ed.). Aldine Publishing Company. ISBN 978-0-202-30319-2.
- Van Schaik, Carel P. (2016). The primate origins of human nature. Foundations of human biology. Hoboken, New Jersey: Wiley-Blackwell. ISBN 978-1-119-11820-6.
- Woody, Debra J.; Woody, David (2019). "Early Childhood". In Hutchison, Elizabeth D. (ed.). Dimensions of Human Behavior: The Changing Life Course (6th ed.). SAGE Publications. pp. 251–326. ISBN 978-1-5443-3934-4. LCCN 2018021374.
