= Steve Duck =

British psychologist

Steven W. Duck is a British social psychologist turned communication scholar, working as the Daniel & Amy Starch Distinguished Research Professor and Chair up to 2021, Department of Rhetoric, at the University of Iowa. He has made contributions to the scientific field of social and personal relationships.

== Education ==
Steve attended Bristol Grammar School and Pembroke College, Oxford before earning a PhD from Sheffield University in 1971. He studied social and personal relationships and published several books and articles on the subject.

== Career ==
Duck taught at the University of Glasgow in Scotland and also the University of Lancaster in England, being one of four founding members of the Department of Psychology there in 1973. In 1986 he moved to the University of Iowa as the Daniel and Amy Starch Distinguished Research Professor, the first fully endowed professorship in the College of Liberal Arts (later the College of Liberal Arts and Sciences – CLAS). He served as Chair Department Executive Officer for the Department of Communication Studies, University of Iowa, (1994–1998) and subsequently as Chair of the University of Iowa Department of Rhetoric (2010–2021).

Duck conducted research into social relationships at Lancaster University. He founded the International Conference on Personal Relationships, the first four of which he organized with Robin Gilmour from Lancaster University, but situating the conference in Madison, Wisconsin in 1982 and 1984. These international conferences have since occurred every two years. Between these first two conferences he founded an interdisciplinary Journal of Social and Personal Relationships and was its first Editor for the fifteen volumes from 1984-1998. He also founded the International Network on Personal Relationships, and, then at the University of Iowa, founded and ran several conferences there both for general scholarly groups and also specifically for graduate students.

He served as president of INPR (International Network on Personal Relationships) which was subsequently merged into IARR (International Association for Relationship Research).

== Publications ==
He has published several books and monographs on the general themes of relationships, becoming most closely associated with models of Interpersonal communication relationship dissolution and in particular with Duck's topographical model of relationship dissolution and a more formalized stages of dissolution model. This latter was later modified by Rollie & Duck (2006).

He has presented over 200 conference papers, written over 100 articles and chapters and written or edited 60 books, the most recent being Duck & McMahan (2017) Communication in Everyday Life: The Basic Course Edition With Public Speaking, and Duck & McMahan (2017) Communication in Everyday Life: A Survey of Communication, Third Edition. In 1982 he became the founding Editor of the Journal of Social and Personal Relationships, and held the position of Editor in Chief until 1998.

== Books ==
- Duck, Steve, and David T. McMahan. Communication in Everyday Life: The Basic Course Edition With Public Speaking. Thousand Oaks, CA, Sage, 2017
- Duck, Steve, and David T. McMahan. Communication in Everyday Life: A Survey of Communication, Third Edition. Thousand Oaks, CA, Sage, 2017
- Duck, Steve. Rethinking Relationships. Los Angeles: Sage Publications, 2011.
- Duck, Steve and David T. McMahan. Communication in Everyday Life,.: Thousand Oaks, CA, Sage, 2010, 2nd ed, 2014
- Duck, Steve, and David T. McMahan. The Basics of Communication: A Relational Perspective. Thousand Oaks, Calif: Sage, 2009.
- Duck, Steve. Human Relationships, fourth edition. Los Angeles: Sage Publications, 2007.
- Duck, Steve., Human Relationships, third edition London: SAGE Publications Ltd, 1998.
- Duck, Steve Meaningful Relationships: Talking, Sense, and Relating SAGE, 1994
- Duck, Steve. Individuals in Relationships. Newbury Park, Calif: Sage Publications, 1993.
- Duck, Steve. Developing Relationships. Newbury Park, Calif: Sage Publications, 1993.
- Duck, Steve., Human Relationships, Second edition London: SAGE Publications Ltd, 1992.
- Duck, Steve. Understanding Relationships. Newbury Park, Calif: Sage Publications, 1991.
- Duck, Steve. Relating to Others. London: Open University Press, 1989.
- Duck, Steve., ed. Handbook of Personal Relationships: Theory, Research, and Interventions. Chichester [England]: Wiley, 1988.
- Perlman, Daniel, and Steve Duck. Intimate Relationships: Development, Dynamics, and Deterioration. Beverly Hills: Sage Publications, 1987.
- Duck, Steve., Human Relationships London: SAGE Publications Ltd, 1986.
- Duck, Steve., Personal relationships 5: Repairing ing Personal Relationships. London and New York: Academic Press, 1984.
- Duck, Steve. Friends, for Life: The Psychology of Close Relationships. New York: St. Martin's Press, 1983.
- Duck, Steve., Personal relationships 4: Dissolving Personal Relationships. London and New York: Academic Press, 1982.
- Duck, Steve, and Robin Gilmour. Personal relationships 1: Studying Personal Relationships. London and New York: Academic Press, 1981a.
- Duck, Steve, and Robin Gilmour. Personal relationships 2: Developing Personal Relationships. London and New York: Academic Press, 1981b.
- Duck, Steve, and Robin Gilmour. Personal relationships 3: Personal Relationships in Disorder. London and New York: Academic Press, 1981c.
- Duck, Steve. The Study of Acquaintance. Farnborough: D.C.Heath/Teakfields, 1977.
- Duck, Steve. Theory and Practice in Interpersonal Attraction. London: Academic Press, 1977.
- Duck, Steve. Personal Relationships and Personal Constructs; A Study of Friendship Formation. London: J. Wiley, 1973.
