= Bronfenbrenner =

Bronfenbrenner (Russian: Бронфенбреннер, Yiddish: בראָנפענברענער) is an Ashkenazi surname. Notable people with the surname include:

- Kate Bronfenbrenner (born 1954), American labor scholar
- Martin Bronfenbrenner (1914–1997), American economist
- Urie Bronfenbrenner (1917–2005), Russian-born American psychologist
